= Chinese Taipei at the 2025 Summer World University Games =

- IOC code: TPE
- NOC: Chinese Taipei University Sports Federation (中華民國大專院校體育總會)
- Website: web2.ctusf.org.tw/index.php

in Rhine-Ruhr metropolitan region, Germany 16 – 27 July 2025
- Competitors: 196 in 15 sports
- Flag bearers: Chen Yi-tung (Fencing); Yang Ya-yi (Tennis)
- Medals Ranked 9th: Gold 5 Silver 13 Bronze 7 Total 25

Summer World University Games appearances
- 1989; 1991; 1993; 1995; 1997; 1999; 2001; 2003; 2005; 2007; 2009; 2011; 2013; 2015; 2017; 2019; 2021; 2025; 2027

Chinese Taipei at the 2025 Summer World University Games in Rhine-Ruhr metropolitan region, Germany with 196 student-athletes participating in 15 sports.

== Medal summary ==
=== Medal table ===
Rank	Sports	Gold	Silver	Bronze	Total
1	Badminton	2	3	1	6
2	Taekwondo	1	4	2	7
3	Table tennis	1	1	2	4
4	Archery	1	1	0	2
5	Gymnastics	0	1	2	3
6	Athletics	0	1	0	1
6	Swimming	0	1	0	1
6	Tennis	0	1	0	1
Totals (8 entries)		5	13	7	25

=== Medalists ===
Medal	Athlete	Sport	Event	Date
Gold	Chen Hsin-ya; Kuo Yen-yu Yang Chang-ying	Taekwondo	Women's team poomsae	July 18
Gold	Chang Ping-cheng; Feng Yi-hsin Huang Yan-cheng; Kao Cheng-jui	Table tennis	Men's team	July 20
Gold	Tang Chih-chun	Archery	Men's individual recurve	July 26
Gold	Ting Yen-chen	Badminton	Men's singles	July 26
Gold	Wu Hsian-yi; Yang Chu-yun	Badminton	Mixed doubles	July 26
Silver	Jung Jiun-jie; Huang Cho-cheng Hung Jiun-yi	Taekwondo	Men's team kyorugi	July 18
Silver	Chen Cheng-kuan; Chen Zhi-ray; Lin Yu-chieh; Su Li-yang; Ting Yen-chen; Wu Hsuan-yi Hsu Yin-hui; Huang Ching-ping; Jheng Yu-chieh; Sung Yu-hsuan; Wang Pei-yu; Yang Chu-yun	Badminton	Mixed team	July 20
Silver	Wang Kuan-hung	Swimming	Men's 200 metres butterfly	July 20
Silver	Huang Ying-hsuan	Taekwondo	Women's 46 kg	July 20
Silver	Hung Jiun-yi	Taekwondo	Men's 80 kg	July 21
Silver	Chin I-chun	Taekwondo	Women's 73+ kg	July 23
Silver	Fu Chao-hsuan	Athletics	Men's high jump	July 24
Silver	Huang Yu-jie	Table tennis	Women's singles	July 24
Silver	Fong You-jhu; Kuo Tzu-ying Li Cai-xuan	Archery	Women's team recurve	July 25
Silver	Li Yu-yun; Lin Fang-an	Tennis	Women's doubles	July 25
Silver	Jheng Yu-chieh; Sung Yi-hsuan	Badminton	Women's doubles	July 26
Silver	Chen Cheng-kuan; Hsu Yin-hui	Badminton	Mixed doubles	July 26
Silver	Tonya Paulsson	Gymnastics	Women's balance beam	July 26
Bronze	Chen Hsiao-tse; Huang Yi-cheng Ke Hsiang-shuo	Taekwondo	Men's team poomsae	July 18
Bronze	Cheng Yung-chi; Chuang Yi-an; Huang Yun-jen Ju Jie-chi; Lu Pei-chi; Pan Yu-kuan	Gymnastics	Women's rhythmic group 3 balls + 2 hoops	July 19
Bronze	Cheng Pu-syuan; Chien Tung-chuan Huang Yu-jie; Tsai Yun-en	Table tennis	Men's team	July 20
Bronze	Chiu Yi-jui	Taekwondo	Men's 74 kg	July 21
Bronze	Chien Tung-chuan; Tsai Yun-en	Table tennis	Women's doubles	July 23
Bronze	Lin Yu-chieh; Jheng Yu-chieh	Badminton	Mixed doubles	July 25
Bronze	Tonya Paulsson	Gymnastics	Women's artistic individual all-around	July 25

== Participants ==
Sport	Men	Women	Total
Archery	6	6	12
Athletics	20	6	26
Badminton	6	6	12
Basketball	13	11	24
Fencing	7	1	8
Artistic gymnastics	5	5	10
Rhythmic gymnastics	—	6	6
Judo	4	5	9
Rowing	3	3	6
Swimming	5	7	12
Table tennis	4	4	8
Taekwondo	13	13	26
Tennis	4	4	8
Volleyball	12	12	24
Beach volleyball	2	2	4
Total	104	91	195

== Archery ==
=== Recurve ===
Men

Archer	Event	Ranking round		First round	Second round	Third round	Fourth round	Quarter-finals	Semi-finals	Finals / BM	Rank
Archer	Event	Score	Rank	Opponent score	Opponent score	Opponent score	Opponent score	Opponent score	Opponent score	Opponent score	Rank
Tang Chih-chun	Individual	667	3	—N/a	Bye	Isles (AUS); W 6–0	Su (TPE); W 6–2	Vetter (GER); W 6–4	Tumer (TUR); W 6–0	Qin (CHN); W 6–5	1st place, gold medalist(s)
Su Yu-yang	Individual	653	14	—N/a	Renaud (SUI); W 6–2	Roziner (ISR); W 6–0	Tang (TPE); L 2–6	Did not advance			9
Kuo Yu-cheng	Individual	641	28	Ng (SGP); W 6–0	Kunnavakkam (USA); W 7–1	Dror (ISR); W 6–2	Wieser (GER); L 0–6	Did not advance			9
Tang Chih-chun; Su Yu-yang; Kuo Yu-cheng	Team	1961	4	—N/a			Belgium (BEL); W 6–0	India (IND); W 5–3	South Korea (KOR); L 0–6	Bronze Medal; Turkey (TUR); L 0–6	4

Women

Archer	Event	Ranking round		First round	Second round	Third round	Fourth round	Quarter-finals	Semi-finals	Finals / BM	Rank
Archer	Event	Score	Rank	Opponent score	Opponent score	Opponent score	Opponent score	Opponent score	Opponent score	Opponent score	Rank
Fong You-jhu	Individual	649	9	Bye	Malolepsza (POL); W 6–0	Kellerer (GER); W 6–4	Özkan (TUR); W 6–4	Liu (CHN); L 0–6	Did not advance		5
Kuo Tzu-ying	Individual	646	14	Bye	Poon (HKG); W 6–4	Abdusattorova (UZB); W 6–0	Nam (KOR); L 2–6	Did not advance			9
Li Cai-xuan	Individual	632	27	Bye	Fatikhova (UZB); W 6–4	Sonoda (JPN); W 6–2	Sébastian (FRA); L 3–7	Did not advance			9
Fong You-jhu; Kuo Tzu-ying; Li Cai-xuan	Team	1927	4	—N/a		Bye	Italy (ITA); W 5–4	India (IND); W 5–1	China (CHN); W 5–3	Japan (JPN); L 2–6	2nd place, silver medalist(s)

Mixed

Archer	Event	Ranking round		1/12 Elimination	1/8 Elimination	Quarter-finals	Semi-finals	Finals / BM	Rank
Archer	Event	Score	Rank	Opponent score	Opponent score	Opponent score	Opponent score	Opponent score	Rank
Tang Chih-chun; Fong You-jhu	Team	1316	5	Bye	Malaysia (MAS); W 5–3	Japan (JPN); L 3–5	Did not advance		5

=== Compound ===
Men

Archer	Event	Ranking round		First round	Second round	Third round	Fourth round	Quarter-finals	Semi-finals	Finals / BM	Rank
Archer	Event	Score	Rank	Opponent score	Opponent score	Opponent score	Opponent score	Opponent score	Opponent score	Opponent score	Rank
Wu Z-wei	Individual	696	8	—N/a	Bye	Tyutyun (KAZ); L 144–145	Did not advance				17
Lin Han-ting	Individual	693	18	Bye	Silva (MEX); W 144–142	Arslan (TUR); L 145–147	Did not advance				17
Huang Jin-le	Individual	689	27	Bye	Ban (JPN); W 143–142	Jadhav (IND); L 143–145	Did not advance				17
Wu Z-wei; Lin Han-ting; Huang Jin-le	Team	2078	4	—N/a			Romania (ROU); W 236–232	Italy (ITA); W 233–225	India (IND); L 233–235	South Korea (KOR); L 233–236	4

Women

Archer	Event	Ranking round		First round	Second round	Third round	Quarter-finals	Semi-finals	Finals / BM	Rank
Archer	Event	Score	Rank	Opponent score	Opponent score	Opponent score	Opponent score	Opponent score	Opponent score	Rank
Chen Si-yu	Individual	685	8	—N/a	Chambraud (FRA); L 137–143	Did not advance				17
Lin Yu-fan	Individual	670	23	Topliceanu (ROU); L 137–140	Did not advance					33
Chiu Yu-erh	Individual	668	27	Bazzichetto (ITA); L 139–140	Did not advance					33
Chen Si-yu; Lin Yu-fan; Chiu Yu-erh	Team	2023	5	—N/a		Romania (ROU); W 229–217	Great Britain (GBR); L 230–299	Did not advance		5

Mixed

Archer	Event	Ranking round		First round	Second round	Quarter-finals	Semi-finals	Finals / BM	Rank
Archer	Event	Score	Rank	Opponent score	Opponent score	Opponent score	Opponent score	Opponent score	Rank
Wu Z-wei; Chen Si-yu	Team	1381	3	—N/a	Portugal (POR); W 154–153	France (FRA); W 153^{20}–153^{19}	India (IND); L 151–158	Bronze medal Great Britain (GBR); L 148–153	4

== Athletics ==
=== Men ===
Track events

Athlete	Event	Preliminary round		Semi-finals		Final	Rank
Athlete	Event	Result	Rank	Result	Rank	Result	Rank
Lin Yu-sian	100 metres	10.47 SB	3 q	10.51	5	Did not advance	
Wei Tai-sheng	100 metres	10.72	4	Did not advance			
Huang Zuo-jyun	200 metres	21.46	3 Q	21.31	6	Did not advance	
Lin Zong-han	200 metres	21.62	4	Did not advance			
Lin Yi-kai	110 metres hurdles	13.71	2 Q	—N/a		13.75	6
Hsieh Yuan-kai	110 metres hurdles	13.99	6	—N/a		Did not advance	
Lin Chung-wei	400 metres hurdles	50.43	1 Q	49.97	4	Did not advance	
Chen Jian-rong	400 metres hurdles	50.69	4 q	50.65	6	Did not advance	
Chan Yung-kuei	20 kilometres walk	—N/a				1:26:58	22
Lin Chia-hung	20 kilometres walk	—N/a				1:33:44	30
Hsu Chia-wei	20 kilometres walk	—N/a				DQ TR54.7.5	—
Chan Yung-kuei; Lin Chia-hung; Hsu Chia-wei	20 kilometres walk team	—N/a				NM	—
Lin Yu-sian; Lin Zong-han; Huang Zuo-jyun; Wei Tai-sheng	4 × 100 metres relay	DNS	—	—N/a		Did not advance	

Field events

Athlete	Event	Qualification		Final	Rank
Athlete	Event	Result	Rank	Result	Rank
Fu Chao-hsuan	High jump	2.13	1 q	2.25	2nd place, silver medalist(s)
Yeh Po-ting	High jump	2.08	8	Did not advance	
Huang Yong-fu	Pole vault	5.25	16	Did not advance	
Lin Tsung-hsien	Pole vault	5.05	24	Did not advance	
Lin Yu-tang	Long jump	7.70	4 q	7.72	6
Li Yun-chen	Triple jump	15.87	10 q	16.28	4
Huang Wei-lin	Triple jump	14.87	24	Did not advance	
Huang Chao-hong	Javelin throw	68.74	9	Did not advance	

Combined events – Decathlon

Athlete	Event	100 m	LJ	SP	HJ	400 m	110H	DT	PV	JT	1500 m	Final	Rank
Cho Chia-hsuan	Result	11.25	6.70	11.94	1.88	52.20	15.21	37.16	4.30	50.71	4:57.43	6871	10
Cho Chia-hsuan	Points	806	743	603	696	716	824	607	702	599	575	6871	10

=== Women's ===
Track event

Athlete	Event	Preliminary round		Semi-finals		Final	Rank
Athlete	Event	Result	Rank	Result	Rank	Result	Rank
Zhang Bo-ya	100 metres hurdles	13.33	4 Q	13.48	6	Did not advance	

Field events

Athlete	Event	Qualification		Final	Rank
Athlete	Event	Result	Rank	Result	Rank
Chiang Ching-yuan	Shot put	16.60	3 q	16.97	6
Jian Chen-xin	Shot put	14.32	11	Did not advance	
Chiang Ching-yuan	Discus throw	44.41	9	Did not advance	
Chu Pin-hsun	Javelin throw	51.36	10 q	52.48	11
Chiu Yu-ting	Javelin throw	50.60	13	Did not advance	

Combined events – Heptathlon

Athlete	Event	100H	HJ	SP	200 m	LJ	JT	800 m	Final	Rank
Chen Cai-juan	Result	14.17 SB	1.62	13.20	25.47	5.76	41.83 SB	2:28.93	5483	10
Chen Cai-juan	Points	954	759	741	844	777	702	706	5483	10

== Badminton ==
=== Men ===
Player	Event	First round	Second round	Third round	Fourth round	Quarter-finals	Semi-finals	Finals / BM	Rank
Player	Event	Opponent score	Opponent score	Opponent score	Opponent score	Opponent score	Opponent score	Opponent score	Rank
Ting Yen-chen	Singles	Bye	Cassar (MLT); W 2–0	Kros (NED); W 2–0	Lai (CAN); W 2–0	Ewe (MAS); W 2–0	Zhou (CHN); W 2–0	Roy (FRA); W 2–0	1st place, gold medalist(s)
Su Li-yang	Singles	Bye	Punchihewa (SRI); W 2–0	Miyashita (JPN); L 0–2	Did not advance				17
Chen Cheng-kuan; Wu Hsuan-yi	Doubles	—N/a	Bye	Su / Ting (TPE); W 2–0	Masumoto / Miyashita (JPN); W 2–0	Sukphun / Teeraratsakul (THA); L 1–2	Did not advance		5
Chen Zhi-ray; Lin Yu-chieh	Doubles	—N/a	Bye	Saengkham / Teerawiwat (THA); W 2–1	Chim / Yuan (USA); W 2–0	Jin / Lee (KOR); L 0–2	Did not advance		5
Su Li-yang; Ting Yen-chen	Doubles	—N/a	Dorji / Pradhan (BHU); W 2–0	Chen / Wu (TPE); L 0–2	Did not advance				17

=== Women ===
Player	Event	First round	Second round	Third round	Fourth round	Quarter-finals	Semi-finals	Finals / BM	Rank
Player	Event	Opponent score	Opponent score	Opponent score	Opponent score	Opponent score	Opponent score	Opponent score	Rank
Huang Ching-ping	Singles	Bye	Dai (CHN); W 2–0	Yuan (CHN); W 2–1	Cloteaux-Foucault (FRA); W 2–0	Lin (USA); L 0–2	Did not advance		5
Wang Pei-yu	Singles	Bye	Imaizumi (JPN); L 0–2	Did not advance					33
Jheng Yu-chieh; Sung Yi-hsuan	Doubles	—N/a	Bye	Lee / Low (MAS); W 2–1	Kim / Lee (KOR); W 2–0	Imaizumi / Kobayashi (JPN); W 2–0	Nakade / Tanabe (JPN); W 2–0	Li / Wang (CHN); L 1–2	2nd place, silver medalist(s)
Hsu Yin-hui; Yang Chu-yun	Doubles	—N/a	Bye	Ramírez / Torralba (ESP); W 2–0	Huang / Wang (TPE); W 2–0	Nakade / Tanabe (JPN); L 0–2	Did not advance		5
Huang Ching-ping; Wang Pei-yu	Doubles	—N/a	Choden / Wangmo (BHU); W 2–0	Go / Zhang (AUS); W 2–0	Hsu / Yang (TPE); L 0–2	Did not advance			9

=== Mixed ===
Player	Event	First round	Second round	Third round	Quarter-finals	Semi-finals	Finals / BM	Rank
Player	Event	Opponent score	Opponent score	Opponent score	Opponent score	Opponent score	Opponent score	Rank
Wu Hsian-yi; Yang Chu-yun	Doubles	Kros / van Leijsen (NED); W 2–0	Panarin / Zhumabek (KAZ); W 2–0	Yoshida / Nakade (JPN); W 2–1	Jin / Lee (KOR); W 2–1	Liao / Li (CHN); W 2–1	Chen / Hsu (TPE); W 2–0	1st place, gold medalist(s)
Chen Cheng-kuan; Hsu Yin-hui	Doubles	Cassar / Clark (MLT); W 2–0	Cimosz / Khomich (POL); W 2–0	Fernández / Carulla (ESP); 0–0	Kim / Lee (KOR); W 2–1	Lin / Jheng (TPE); W 2–1	Wu / Yang (TPE); L 0–2	2nd place, silver medalist(s)
Lin Yu-chieh; Jheng Yu-chieh	Doubles	Lau / Mehta (HKG); W 2–0	Minamimoto / Tanabe (JPN); W 2–0	Sato / Hirose (JPN); W 2–0	Bourakkadi / Michalski (GER); W 2–0	Chen / Hsu (TPE); L 1–2	Did not advance	3rd place, bronze medalist(s)

=== Team ===
Team	Event	Group stage			Round of 16	Quarter-finals	Semi-finals	Final	Rank
Team	Event	Opponent score	Opponent score	Rank	Opponent score	Opponent score	Opponent score	Opponent score	Rank
Chinese Taipei Chen Cheng-kuan; Chen Zhi-ray; Lin Yu-chieh; Su Li-yang; Ting Yen-chen; Wu Hsuan-yi Hsu Yin-hui; Huang Ching-ping; Jheng Yu-chieh; Sung Yu-hsuan; Wang Pei-yu; Yang Chu-yun	Team	Germany (GER); W 3–2	—N/a	1 Q	Spain (ESP); W 3–0	Japan (JPN); W 3–1	India (IND); W 3–1	China (CHN); L 1–3	2nd place, silver medalist(s)

== Basketball ==
Summary

Team	Event	Group stage				9th/16th Placing	9th/12th Placing	11th Placing	Rank
Team	Event	Opponent score	Opponent score	Opponent score	Rank	Opponent score	Opponent score	Opponent score	Rank
Chinese Taipei men	Men	Germany (GER); L 73–83	Chile (CHI); W 72–54	Finland (FIN); L 77–110	3	India (IND); W 102–77	Poland (POL); L 87–89	Latvia (LAT); L 91–97	12
Chinese Taipei women	Women	Poland (POL); L 69–77	United States (USA); L 68–79	Germany (GER); L 40–81	4	Argentina (ARG); W 90–62	Lithuania (LTU); L 59–71	Brazil (BRA); W 83–78	11

=== Men's tournament ===
Team roster

Chinese Taipei men's national basketball team – 2025 Summer World University Games roster
Players
Coaches

Pos.	No.	Name	Age – Date of birth	Height	Club	Ctr.
PF	5	Wu Zhi-kai	21 – 19 September 2003	1.96 m (6 ft 5 in)	NCCU Griffins	(Taiwan)
PG	7	Yu Ai-che (C)	23 – 14 February 2002	1.81 m (5 ft 11 in)	Shiga Lakes	(Japan)
PG	8	Lee Yun-chieh	24 – 21 August 2000	1.88 m (6 ft 2 in)	TSG GhostHawks	(Taiwan)
PG	10	Sung Hsin-hao	21 – 4 September 2003	1.85 m (6 ft 1 in)	NCCU Griffins	(Taiwan)
SG	11	Hsu Te-chi	20 – 9 February 2005	1.78 m (5 ft 10 in)	NCCU Griffins	(Taiwan)
SF	12	Lin Sin-kuan	23 – 9 May 2002	1.92 m (6 ft 4 in)	Taoyuan Taiwan Beer Leopards	(Taiwan)
SF	13	Chang Yu-wei	20 – 31 December 2004	1.90 m (6 ft 3 in)
PF	14	Hu Chin-hao	21 – 20 October 2003	1.98 m (6 ft 6 in)
C	22	Wang Sheng-lin	24 – 1 December 2000	2.05 m (6 ft 9 in)
SF	23	Chen Fan Po-yan	25 – 24 January 2000	1.93 m (6 ft 4 in)	TSG GhostHawks	(Taiwan)
SF	42	Wang Kai-yu	23 – 11 January 2002	1.90 m (6 ft 3 in)	Kaohsiung Steelers	(Taiwan)
C	77	Sun Shao-ci	22 – 10 October 2002	2.00 m (6 ft 7 in)

Head coach

- (Chinese Taipei) Chen Tzu-wei
- (Chinese Taipei) Ke Chi-hao

Assistant coach(es)

- (Chinese Taipei) Fan Keng-hsiang

Legend

- (C) Team captain
- Club – describes last
  club before the tournament
- Age – describes age
  on 18 July 2025

Roster

Group stage – Group A

Pos	Team	Pld	W	L	PF	PA	PD	Pts	Qualification
1	Germany (H)	3	3	0	244	189	+55	6	Quarterfinals
2	Finland	3	2	1	273	207	+66	5	Quarterfinals
3	Chinese Taipei	3	1	2	222	247	−25	4	9 to 16 placing
4	Chile	3	0	3	153	249	−96	3	9 to 16 placing

Source: FISU
Rules for classification: 1) classification points; 2) head-to-head results; 3) head-to-head game points difference; 4) head-to-head number of game points scored.
(H) Hosts

July 19
20:00

Report

Germany	83–73	Chinese Taipei
Scoring by quarter: 20–21, 17–15, 25–25, 21–12
Pts: Rataj 21; Rebs: Saffer 19; Asts: Baggette 5		Pts: 20 Lin S-k; Rebs: 6 Yu A-c, Lin S-k; Asts: 5 Sun H-h, Hsu T-c

Grugahalle, Germany
Referees: Ivan Huck (ARG), Alin Faur (ROU), Lauren Niemiera (USA)

July 20
20:00

Report

Chile	54–72	Chinese Taipei
Scoring by quarter: 17–13, 15–10, 14–21, 8–28
Pts: Saez 13; Rebs: Aguilera 9 Asts: Aguilera 4		Pts: 22 Sung H-h; Rebs: 9 Yu A-c; Asts: 7 Yu A-c

Sportpark am Hallo, Germany
Referees: Einārs Tukišs (LAT), Danilo Molina (ARG), Sergio Kassab (LBN)

July 21
14:30

Report

Finland	110–77	Chinese Taipei
Scoring by quarter: 32–16, 28–20, 32–21, 18–20
Pts: Tainamo 26; Rebs: Tainamo 9 Asts: Lindberg, Permanto 5		Pts: 17 Sung H-h; Rebs: 6 Chen Fan P-y; Asts: 6 Hsu T-c

Ischelandhalle, Germany
Referees: Alin Faur (ROU), Prem Kanneboina (IND), Nicolas Zivieri (BRA)

9th to 16th Placing stage

July 23
14:30

Report

Chinese Taipei	102–77	India
Scoring by quarter: 32–20, 17–13, 28–22, 25–22
Pts: Lee Y-c 16; Rebs: Hu C-h 10; Asts: Hsu T-c 7		Pts: 17 Billa; Rebs: 6 Ishan; Asts: 6 Billa

Ischelandhalle, Germany
Referees: Diogo Martins (POR), Marin Kucirek (CZE), Milutin Jelenić (GER)

9th to 12th Placing stage

July 24
14:30

Report

Chinese Taipei	87–89	Poland
Scoring by quarter: 25–22, 19–24, 20–21, 23–22
Pts: Hsu 17; Rebs: Yu A-c, Hu C-h 7 Asts: Hsu 5		Pts: 21 Andrzejewski; Rebs: 11 Kempa; Asts: 6 Gordon

Grugahalle, Germany
Referees: Nicolas Zivieri (BRA), Alexander Moskovic (GER), Haruga Iwai (JPN)

11th Placing stage

July 26
12:00

Report

Chinese Taipei	91–97	Latvia
Scoring by quarter: 26–24, 28–14, 21–21, 16–38
Pts: Chen Fan 26; Rebs: Wu, Hsu 5 Asts: Hsu 9		Pts: 24 Rihards Aleksandrovs; Rebs: 8 Rihards Aleksandrovs; Asts: 7 Valters Briedis

Sportpark am Hallo, Germany
Referees: Nicolas Zivieri (BRA), Alexandra-Ioana Stan (ROU), Nermin Hodzic (BIH)

=== Women's tournament ===
Team roster

Chinese Taipei women's national basketball team – 2025 Summer World University Games roster
Players
Coaches

Pos.	No.	Name	Age – Date of birth	Height	Club	Ctr.
SG	0	Huang Cin-yu (C)	24 – 30 August 2000	1.69 m (5 ft 7 in)	Taipower	(Taiwan)
PG	4	Li Yi-hua	23 – 1 February 2002	1.63 m (5 ft 4 in)
PG	6	Huang Chiao-chun	23 – 24 October 2001	1.72 m (5 ft 8 in)
PF	7	Yu Chin-hua	21 – 23 June 2004	1.82 m (6 ft 0 in)
PF	8	Tsai Yu-lien	21 – 6 October 2003	1.77 m (5 ft 10 in)
PF	9	Chen Chih-ying	22 – 30 July 2002	1.75 m (5 ft 9 in)	CHTWBT	(Taiwan)
C	11	Hsiao Yu-wen	20 – 5 March 2005	1.85 m (6 ft 1 in)	Cathay Life Tigers	(Taiwan)
SG	12	Wang Yueh-ti	23 – 9 October 2001	1.75 m (5 ft 9 in)
SG	13	Lin Chia-jung	24 – 4 January 2001	1.70 m (5 ft 7 in)
PF	14	Cheng Hui-tzu	23 – 5 October 2001	1.74 m (5 ft 9 in)
C	23	Belle Cecelia Bramer	19 – 26 May 2006	1.85 m (6 ft 1 in)

Head coach

- (Chinese Taipei) Ke Chi-hao

Assistant coach(es)

- (Chinese Taipei) Lan Hao-yu
- (Chinese Taipei) Liang Chia-yin
- (Chinese Taipei) Lin Chi-wen

Legend

- (C) Team captain
- Club – describes last
  club before the tournament
- Age – describes age
  on 18 July 2025

Roster

Group stage – Group B

Pos	Team	Pld	W	L	PF	PA	PD	Pts	Qualification
1	Poland	3	3	0	217	190	+27	6	Quarterfinals
2	United States	3	2	1	219	208	+11	5	Quarterfinals
3	Germany (H)	3	1	2	194	172	+22	4	9 to 16 placing
4	Chinese Taipei	3	0	3	177	237	−60	3	9 to 16 placing

Source: FISU
Rules for classification: 1) classification points; 2) head-to-head results; 3) head-to-head game points difference; 4) head-to-head number of game points scored.
(H) Hosts

July 18
17:30

Report

Chinese Taipei	69–77 (OT)	Poland
Scoring by quarter: 11–17, 21–12, 15–18, 13–13, Overtime: 9–17
Pts: Wang Y-t 15; Rebs: Hsian Y-w 7 Asts: Huang C-c 5		Pts: 17 Kulińska; Rebs: 9 Kulińska; Asts: 4 Wojtala

Ischelandhalle, Germany
Referees: Juozas Barkauskas (LTU), Mariajesus González (CHI), Nermin Hodzic (BIH)

July 19
17:30

Report

Chinese Taipei	68–79	United States
Scoring by quarter: 13–21, 21–18, 16–19, 18–21
Pts: Hsiao Y-w 14; Rebs: Yu C-h 7 Asts: Huang C-y 5		Pts: 20 Gaston; Rebs: 10 Bristow; Asts: 7 Love

Ischelandhalle, Germany
Referees: Tijmen Last (NED), Balázs Mészáros (HUN), Hwang Ji-sun (KOR)

Jul 20
14:30

Report

Chinese Taipei	40–81	Germany
Scoring by quarter: 9–24, 8–23, 7–24, 16–10
Pts: Wang Y-t 11; Rebs: Yu C-h, Hsiao Y-w 5 Asts: Tsai Y-l 4		Pts: 16 Wittenberg; Rebs: 6 Gaba, Brennecke; Asts: 3 3 players

Grugahalle, Germany
Referees: Haruga Iwai (JPN), Martin Kučirek (CZE), Diogo Martins (POR)

9th to 16th Placing stage

Jul 22
12:00

Report

Argentina	62–90	Chinese Taipei
Scoring by quarter: 17–20, 16–24, 18–24, 11–22
Pts: Santini 15; Rebs: Bellosta 9 Asts: Hentschel 2		Pts: 25 Hsiao Y-w; Rebs: 15 Hsiao Y-w; Asts: 6 Huang C-c

Ischelandhalle, Germany
Referees: Claudio Osorio (ARG), Imran Ali Baig (IND), Anna Sofie Englisch (GER)

9th to 12th Placing stage

July 23
14:30

Report

Chinese Taipei	59–71	Lithuania
Scoring by quarter: 18–20, 16–16, 17–14, 8–21
Pts: Tsai Y-l 13; Rebs: Yu C-h 9 Asts: Huang C-y 4		Pts: 16 Paliulytė; Rebs: 10 Miknaitė; Asts: 3 Paliulytė

Walter-Schädlich-Halle, Germany
Referees: Hwang Ji-sun (KOR), Mariajesus González (CHI), Tobias Kazda (GER)

11th Placing stage

Jul 25
12:00

Report

Chinese Taipei	83–78 (OT)	Brazil
Scoring by quarter: 14–17, 20–17, 16–26, 18–8, Overtime: 15–10
Pts: Lin C-j 28; Rebs: Yu C-h 13; Asts: Huang C-c 10		Pts: 22 Nascimento; Rebs: 6 3 players Asts: 6 Moreira

Sportpark am Hallo, Germany
Referees: Claudio Osorio (CHI), Michael Oesterle (GER), Milutin Jelenić (GER)

== Fencing ==
=== Individual ===
Fencer	Event	Pool round							Round of 128	Round of 64	Round of 32	Round of 16	Quarter-finals	Semi-finals	Final	Rank
Fencer	Event	Opponent score	Opponent score	Opponent score	Opponent score	Opponent score	Opponent score	Rank	Opponent score	Opponent score	Opponent score	Opponent score	Opponent score	Opponent score	Opponent score	Rank
Hsu Hao	Men's épée	Jeal (GBR); L 1–5	Heo (KOR); L 3–4	Bäckström (SWE); L 0–5	Ghivoly (ISR); W 5–1	Brochard (SUI); W 5–4	Sohil (IND); W 5–4	5	Al-Akkas (KSA); L 9–15	Did not advance						74
Lin Wei-chen	Men's épée	Wingerter (FRA); L 0–5	Osman-Touson (HUN); W 4–3	Pieper (NED); W 4–3	Martín (ESP); L 2–3	Gurov (AIN); L 2–5	—N/a	6	Kuhta (FIN); L 5–15	Did not advance						77
Wu Hsiang-ching	Men's épée	Coufal (CZE); W 5–2	Belozerov (AIN); L 2–5	Kim (USA); W 5–1	Berry (GBR); L 2–5	Krasniuk (UKR); L 3–4	Schembri (ISV); L 3–5	6	Joshi (IND); L 12–15	Did not advance						81
Chen Pin-jui	Men's épée	Pavlov (KAZ); L 3–5	Sauri (MEX); L 0–5	Straub (GER); L 3–5	De Bock (BEL); L 0–5	Trofymenko (UKR); W 5–3	Saner (RSA); W 3–5	7	Did not advance							105
Chen Chih-chieh	Men's foil	Cherkashyn (UKR); W 5–3	Ask (SWE); L 4–5	Rokhkind (ISR); W 5–2	Lo (USA); W 5–2	Sármány (SVK); W 5–0	Hubner (AUT); W 5–3	1	—N/a	Bye	Lazarenko (UKR); W 15–12	Mak (HKG); W 15–11	Choi (KOR); L 13–15	Did not advance		5
Chen Yi-tung	Men's foil	Mak (HKG); W 5–1	Marcos (ESP); W 5–1	Pacholczyk (POL); L 3–5	Bosnic (AUS); L 3–5	Jain (USA); W 5–1	Choi (KOR); W 5–3	2	—N/a	Haasbeek (NED); W 15–6	Di Veroli (ITA); L 10–15	Did not advance				23
Yueh Che-hao	Men's foil	Fazekas (SVK); L 5–4	Elmfeldt (SWE); W 5–1	Kwiatkowski (POL); L 3–5	Lim (KOR); L 1–5	Kreiziger (SLO); W 5–0	Martini (ITA); L 2–5	5	—N/a	Di Veroli (ITA); L 6–15	Did not advance					53
Hsu Sheng-hung	Men's foil	Hussein (QAT); L 1–5	Fabinger (GER); L 3–5	Lombardi (ITA); L 2–5	Mautner (AUS); W 5–1	Nowak (POL); L 3–5	Sharma (IND); W 5–2	5	—N/a	Martini (ITA); L 9–15	Did not advance					55
Mia Wu	Women's épée	Vergnes (LTU); W 5–1	Hafeez (USA); W 5–1	Kumar (IND); W 5–1	Kim (KOR); L 4–5	Engdahl (SWE); W 5–4	Heubi (SUI); W 5–3	1	Bye	Lai (HKG); W 15–14	Conrad (UKR); L 10–15	Did not advance				18

=== Team ===
Fencer	Event	Round of 32	Round of 16	Quarter-finals	Semi-finals	Final	Rank
Fencer	Event	Opponent score	Opponent score	Opponent score	Opponent score	Opponent score	Rank
Chen Pin-jui; Hsu Hao; Lin Wei-chen; Wu Hsiang-ching	Team épée	Estonia (EST); L 35–45	Did not advance				21
Chen Chih-chieh; Chen Yi-tung; Hsu Sheng-hung; Yueh Che-hao	Team foil	Bye	Great Britain (GBR); W 45–33	Japan (JPN); L 44–45	Did not advance		7

== Gymnastics ==
=== Artistic ===
Men

Team

Gymnast	Event	Apparatus						Total	Rank
Gymnast	Event	F	PH	R	V	PB	HB	Total	Rank
Lin Guan-yi	Team	~~12.033~~	~~10.633~~	13.966 Q	~~13.400~~	~~11.500~~	—N/a		
Chiou Min-han	Team	13.600	13.200	11.800	13.700	12.733	~~10.866~~	75.899	23
Chuang Chia-lung	Team	13.366	12.933	11.933	13.566	11.800	13.333	76.931	16 Q
Lee Ming-liang	Team	—N/a					11.166	—N/a	
Yeh Cheng	Team	12.833	11.500	~~11.766~~	14.066 Q	12.100	12.600	74.865	27
Total	Team	39.799	37.633	37.699	41.332	36.633	37.099	230.195	10

Individual finals

Gymnast	Event	Qualification								Final							
Gymnast	Event	Apparatus						Total	Rank	Apparatus						Total	Rank
Gymnast	Event	F	PH	R	V	PB	HB	Total	Rank	F	PH	R	V	PB	HB	Total	Rank
Chuang Chia-lung	All-around	See team results above								13.233	13.633	12.066	13.500	12.500	13.333	78.265	10
Lin Guan-yi	Rings	—N/a			13.966	—N/a		13.966	6 Q	—N/a				13.033	—N/a	13.033	7
Yeh Cheng	Vault	—N/a				13.649	—N/a	13.649	7 Q	—N/a			13.433	—N/a		13.433	6

Women

Team

Gymnast	Event	Apparatus				Total	Rank
Gymnast	Event	V	UB	BB	F	Total	Rank
Ting Hua-tien	Team	—N/a	12.400	12.150	11.650	—N/a	
Lin Yi-chen	Team	~~11.750~~	11.550	~~11.350~~	~~10.450~~	45.100	53
Wu Sing-fen	Team	13.000	—N/a				
Tonya Paulsson	Team	12.900	13.400	13.250 Q	12.800 Q	52.350	3 Q
Liao Yi-chun	Team	12.750	~~11.000~~	11.850	12.300	47.900	35
Total	Team	38.650	37.350	37.250	36.750	150.000	6

Individual finals

Gymnast	Event	Qualification						Final					
Gymnast	Event	Apparatus				Total	Rank	Apparatus				Total	Rank
Gymnast	Event	V	UB	BB	F	Total	Rank	V	UB	BB	F	Total	Rank
Tonya Paulsson	All-around	See team results above						12.800	13.466	12.96	12.833	52.065	3rd place, bronze medalist(s)
Tonya Paulsson	Balance beam	—N/a		13.250	—N/a	13.250	6 Q	—N/a		13.266	—N/a	13.266	2nd place, silver medalist(s)
Tonya Paulsson	Floor	—N/a			12.800	12.800	7 Q	—N/a			13.000	13.000	4

=== Rhythmic ===
Gymnast	Event	Qualification				Final			
Gymnast	Event	Apparatus		Score	Rank	Apparatus		Score	Rank
Gymnast	Event	5 app.	3+2 app.	Score	Rank	5 app.	3+2 app.	Score	Rank
Chen Yung-chi; Chuang Yi-an; Huang Yun-jen; Ju Jie-chi; Lu Pei-chi; Pan Yu-kuan	All-around	16.500 Q	22.750 Q	39.250	4	—N/a			
Chen Yung-chi; Chuang Yi-an; Huang Yun-jen; Ju Jie-chi; Lu Pei-chi; Pan Yu-kuan	5 ribbons	See team results above				15.250	—N/a	15.250	5
Chen Yung-chi; Chuang Yi-an; Huang Yun-jen; Ju Jie-chi; Lu Pei-chi; Pan Yu-kuan	3 balls+2 hoops	See team results above				—N/a	23.000	23.000	3rd place, bronze medalist(s)

== Judo ==
=== Individual ===
Judoka	Event	Round of 32	Round of 16	Quarter-finals	Semi-finals	Repechage	Finals	Rank
Judoka	Event	Opponent score	Opponent score	Opponent score	Opponent score	Opponent score	Opponent score	Rank
Chiu Wei-jie	Men's 60 kg	Yang (USA); L 000–010	Did not advance					
Chang Keng-hsien	Men's 73 kg	Agaian (AIN); L 000–100	Did not advance					
Chen Peng-yu	Men's 90 kg	Bulić (CRO); L 000–001	Did not advance					
Dai You-ming	Men's +100 kg	Ghangas (IND); W 100–000	Zholdoshkaziev (KGZ); L 000–020	Did not advance				
Chiu Chih-jou	Women's 48 kg	Elias (LBN); W 021–000	Semikolenova (AIN); W 100–000	Zhuang (CHN); L 000–101	Did not advance	Szlachta (POL); L 000–100	Did not advance	7
Lin Wei-ting	Women's 57 kg	de Jong (NED); W 110–000	Kallinger (AUT); L 000–101	Did not advance				
Yuan Pei-chun	Women's 70 kg	Kulić (CRO); L 000–100	Did not advance					
Wang Chieh-hsi	Women's 78 kg	Vizoso (ESP); L 000–100	Did not advance					
Lu Hsin-jui	Women's +78 kg	Sweers (NED); L 000–100	Did not advance					
Chiu Wei-jie; Chang Keng-hsien; Chen Peng-yu; Dai You-ming; Lin Wei-ting; Yuan Pei-chun; Wang Chieh-hsi; Lu Hsin-jui	Mixed team	Spain (ESP); L 1–4	Did not advance					

== Rowing ==
Rower	Event	Heat		Quarter-final		Semi-final		Final	
Rower	Event	Time	Rank	Time	Rank	Time	Rank	Time	Rank
Lee Jui-che	Men's single sculls	7:34.88	5 Q	8:10.68	6 FD	Bye		7:42.03	24
Lin Yu-han	Women's single sculls	9:02.03	4 Q	10:13.75	6 FD	Bye		9:26.55	23
Lin Hsuan-yun; Wang Chen-yue; Li Ji-hong; Yu Pei-fen	Mixed quadruple sculls	6:45.77	4 FB	—N/a				7:01.40	8

== Swimming ==
=== Men ===
Swimmer	Event	Heat		Semi-final		Final	
Swimmer	Event	Time	Rank	Time	Rank	Time	Rank
Fan Chen-wei	50 m freestyle	23.15	33	Did not advance			
Chuang Mu-lan	50 m freestyle	23.25	37	Did not advance			
Fan Chen-wei	100 m freestyle	51.12	45	Did not advance			
Fu Kun-ming	100 m freestyle	51.50	49	Did not advance			
Chuang Mu-lun	50 m backstroke	25.58	=8 Q	25.58	=13	Did not advance	
Chuang Mu-lan	100 m backstroke	55.23	11 Q	55.15	13	Did not advance	
Liu Ching-hung	100 m breaststroke	1:02.38	26	Did not advance			
Liu Ching-hung	200 m breaststroke	2:14.40	11 Q	2:13.57	12	Did not advance	
Wang Kuan-hung	100 m butterfly	52.73	9 Q	52.35	8 Q	52.18	5
Wang Kuan-hung	200 m butterfly	1:58.39	7 Q	1:55.65	1 Q	1:55.85	2nd place, silver medalist(s)
Fu Kun-ming	200 m individual medley	2:02.25	15 Q	2:02.26	13	Did not advance	
Fu Kun-ming	400 m individual medley	4:28.15	13	—N/a		Did not advance	
Chuang Mu-lun; Liu Ching-hung; Wang Kuan-hung; Fan Chen-wei	4 × 100 m medley relay	3:42.29	13	—N/a		Did not advance	

=== Women ===
Swimmer	Event	Heat		Semi-final		Final	
Swimmer	Event	Time	Rank	Time	Rank	Time	Rank
Chiu Yi-chen	50 m freestyle	25.66	12 Q	25.42	12	Did not advance	
Liu Pei-yin	50 m freestyle	25.89	17	Did not advance			
Han An-chi	100 m freestyle	55.34	5 Q	55.26	10	Did not advance	
Liu Pei-yin	100 m freestyle	56.98	25	Did not advance			
Liao Yu-fei	50 m backstroke	29.22	13 Q	29.42	16	Did not advance	
Liao Yu-fei	100 m backstroke	1:03.77	23	Did not advance			
Wang Wan-chen	100 m backstroke	1:04.68	26	Did not advance			
Han An-chi	200 m backstroke	2:11.96	10 Q	2:12.47	14	Did not advance	
Chiu Yi-chen	50 m breaststroke	31.85	14 Q	32.15	16	Did not advance	
Hung Chieh-yu	50 m breaststroke	33.17	27	Did not advance			
Hung Chieh-yu	100 m breaststroke	1:12.15	27	Did not advance			
Chiu Yi-chen	50 m butterfly	26.98	12 Q	26.78	=11	Did not advance	
Liu Pei-yin	50 m butterfly	27.48	21	Did not advance			
Liu Pei-yin	100 m butterfly	1:00.64	15 Q	1:00.75	16	Did not advance	
Applejean Virginia Gwinn	100 m butterfly	1:01.93	23	Did not advance			
Applejean Virginia Gwinn	200 m butterfly	2:14.58	15 Q	2:15.24	13	Did not advance	
Han An-chi	200 m individual medley	2:16.53	8 Q	2:15.31	11	Did not advance	
Wang Wan-chen	200 m individual medley	2:18.76	17	Did not advance			
Applejean Virginia Gwinn	400 m individual medley	4:49.12	10	—N/a		Did not advance	
Liao Yu-fei; Chiu Yi-chen; Han An-chi; Liu Pei-yin	4 × 100 metre freestyle relay	3:47.07	8 Q	—N/a		3:46.77	8
Liao Yu-fei; Hung Chieh-yu; Liu Pei-yin; Han An-chi	4 × 100 metre medley relay	4:13.30	8 Q	—N/a		4:13.87	7

=== Mixed ===
Swimmer	Event	Heat		Final	
Swimmer	Event	Time	Rank	Time	Rank
Fan Chen-wei; Chung Mu-lun; Liu Pei-yin; Liao Yu-fei	4 × 100 m freestyle relay	3:35.75	9	Did not advance	

== Table tennis ==
=== Men ===
Player	Event	Preliminary	Round of 64	Round of 32	Round of 16	Quarter-finals	Semi-finals	Final / BM	Rank
Player	Event	Opponent score	Opponent score	Opponent score	Opponent score	Opponent score	Opponent score	Opponent score	Rank
Feng Yi-hsin	Singles	Bye	Singh (IND); W 4–0	Kenzhigulov (KAZ); W 4–1	Istrate (ROU); W 4–0	Sun (CHN); L 3–4	Did not advance		5
Kao Cheng-jui	Singles	Bye	Hogye (HUN); W 4–0	Okano (JPN); W 4–1	Chen (CHN); W 4–1	Sidorenko (AIN); L 2–4	Did not advance		5
Huang Yan-cheng	Singles	Bye	Yun (KOR); W 4–3	Toma (ROU); L 1–4	Did not advance				17
Chang Ping-cheng	Singles	Win (AUS); W 4–0	Andersen (DEN); L 3–4	Did not advance					33
Chang Ping-cheng; Feng Yi-hsin	Doubles	—N/a	Chintugs / Munkhbat (MGL); W 3–0	Grebnev / Sidorenko (AIN); W 3–2	Cho / Yun (KOR); L 2–3	Did not advance			9
Huang Yan-cheng; Kao Cheng-jui	Doubles	—N/a	Bye	Kang / Lee (KOR); W 3–0	Okano / Tanigaki (JPN); L 2–3	Did not advance			9
Chang Ping-cheng; Feng Yi-hsin; Huang Yan-cheng; Kao Cheng-jui	Team	—N/a			Poland (POL); W 3–0	South Korea (KOR); W 3–0	Japan (JPN); W 3–1	China (CHN); W 3–2	1st place, gold medalist(s)

=== Women ===
Player	Event	Preliminary	Round of 64	Round of 32	Round of 16	Quarter-finals	Semi-finals	Final / BM	Rank
Player	Event	Opponent score	Opponent score	Opponent score	Opponent score	Opponent score	Opponent score	Opponent score	Rank
Huang Yu-jie	Singles	Bye	Tayapitak (THA); W 4–0	Yılmaz (TUR); W 4–2	Lutz (FRA); W 4–2	Asada (JPN); W 4–3	Ng (HKG); W 4–1	Zhao (CHN); L 0–4	2nd place, silver medalist(s)
Chien Tung-chuan	Singles	Bye	Dari (HUN); W 4–1	Saini (IND); W 4–1	Labošová (SVK); W 4–1	Zhao (CHN); L 0–4	Did not advance		5
Cheng Pu-syuan	Singles	Bye	van Lierop (NED); W 4–1	Cok (FRA); W 4–1	Ng (HKG); L 3–4	Did not advance			9
Tsai Yun-en	Singles	Bye	Ernst (NED); W 4–0	Idesawa (JPN); L 0–4	Did not advance				17
Chien Tung-chuan; Tsai Yun-en	Doubles	—N/a	Bye	Avezou / Picard (FRA); W 3–0	Lai / Tan (SGP); W 3–1	Aoi / Idesawa (JPN); W 4–0	Han / Wang (CHN); L 2–4	Did not advance	3rd place, bronze medalist(s)
Cheng Pu-syuan; Huang Yu-jie	Doubles	—N/a	Bye	Chan / Cheng (SGP); W 3–0	Singeorzan / Zaharia (ROU); L 0–3	Did not advance			9
Cheng Pu-syuan; Chien Tung-chuan; Huang Yu-jie; Tsai Yun-en	Team	—N/a			Poland (POL); W 3–0	India (IND); W 3–0	China (CHN); L 0–3	Did not advance	3rd place, bronze medalist(s)

=== Mixed ===
Player	Event	Preliminary	Round of 64	Round of 32	Round of 16	Quarter-finals	Semi-finals	Final / BM	Rank
Player	Event	Opponent score	Opponent score	Opponent score	Opponent score	Opponent score	Opponent score	Opponent score	Rank
Feng Yi-hsin; Tsai Yun-en	Doubles	Bye	Garlini / Miyabara (BRA); W 3–0	Singh / Saini (IND); W 3–0	Koh / Tan (SGP); W 3–0	Zeng / Han (CHN); L 3–4	Did not advance		5
Kao Cheng-jui; Chieh Tung-chuan	Doubles	Bye	Lonconado / Infante (CHI); W 3–0	Okano / Idesawa (JPN); L 1–3	Did not advance				17

== Taekwondo ==
=== Kyorugi ===
Athlete	Event	Round of 64	Round of 32	Round of 16	Quarter-finals	Semi-finals	Final / BM	Rank
Athlete	Event	Opponent score	Opponent score	Opponent score	Opponent score	Opponent score	Opponent score	Rank
Li Ci-en	Men's 54 kg	—N/a	Brindamohan (CAN); L 1–2	Did not advance				17
Pan Kuei-an	Men's 58 kg	—N/a	Altybaev (KGZ); W 2–0	Deepanshu (IND); W 2–0	Manenkov (UKR); L 1–2	Did not advance		5
Huang Cho-cheng	Men's 63 kg	Bye	Elsersy (EGY); W 2–0	Jendoubi (TUN); L 0–2	Did not advance			9
Hsu Hao-yu	Men's 68 kg	—N/a	Rakib (MAS); W 2–0	Lo (HKG); W 2–0	Tubtimdang (MGL); L 1–2	Did not advance		5
Chiu Yi-jui	Men's 74 kg	—N/a	Cudnoch (POL); W 2–0	Ismayilzada (AZE); W 2–0	Amir (FRA) –	Kintsurashvili (GEO); L 0–2	Did not advance	3rd place, bronze medalist(s)
Hung Jiun-yi	Men's 80 kg	—N/a	Bye	Young (USA); W 2–0	Hrgota (CRO); W 2–0	Hurnov (UKR); W 2–0	Seo (KOR); L 1–2	2nd place, silver medalist(s)
Chen Liang-hsi	Men's 87 kg	—N/a	Bye	Snacov (ROU); W 2–0	Piątkowski (POL); L 1–2	Did not advance		5
Jung Jiun-jie	Men's +87 kg	—N/a	Satvinder (IND); W 2–0	Kablan (KAZ); L 0–2	Did not advance			9
Huang Cho-cheng; Hung Jiun-yi; Jung Jiun-jie	Men's team	—N/a	Bye	Malaysia (MAS); W 2–0	Thailand (THA); W 2–0	Uzbekistan (UZB); W 2–0	South Korea (KOR); L 0–2	2nd place, silver medalist(s)
Huang Ying-hsuan	Women's 46 kg	—N/a	Bye	Ana Jiménez (ESP); W 2–0	Poolkerd (THA); W 2–1	Bertagnin (ITA); W 2–0	Kim (KOR); L 0–2	2nd place, silver medalist(s)
Liu You-yun	Women's 49 kg	—N/a	Silva (MEX); W 2–0	Bucheli (ECU); W 2–0	Ma (CHN); L 1–2	Did not advance		5
Jiang Yi-shan	Women's 53 kg	—N/a	Zayniddinova (UZB); L 0–2	Did not advance				17
Lin Wei-chun	Women's 57 kg	Bye	Yandolovskaya (AIN); W 2–0	Torres (ESP); W 2–0	Lima (BRA); L 0–2	Did not advance		5
Chang Jui-en	Women's 62 kg	—N/a	Bye	Secanell (ESP); L 0–2	Did not advance			9
Chiu Shao-hsuan	Women's 67 kg	—N/a	Mehnana (FRA); W 2–1	Khussainova (KAZ); L 0–2	Did not advance			9
Hsu Yu-hsi	Women's 73 kg	—N/a			Oh (KOR); L 1–2	Did not advance		5
Chin I-chun	Women's +73 kg	—N/a	Bye	Husović (GER); W 1–0	Shvedkova (AIN); W 2–0	Haremza (POL); W 2–0	Song (KOR); L 0–2	2nd place, silver medalist(s)
Chang Jui-en; Chin I-chun; Lin Wei-chun	Women's team	—N/a	Bye	Mexico (MEX); W 2–0	Thailand (THA); L 0–2	Did not advance		5
Hsu Hao-yu; Chen Liang-hsi; Chiu Shao-hsuan; Hsu Yu-hsi	Mixed team	—N/a	Bye	Kazakhstan (KAZ); L 1–2	Did not advance			9

=== Poomsae ===
Athlete	Event	Round of 32	Round of 16	Final	Rank
Athlete	Event	Opponent score	Opponent score	Score	Rank
Tsai Ho-hsuan	Men's individual	Liu (CHN); W 8.949–8.683	Fernández (ESP); L 8.766–8.799	Did not advance	9
Chen Hsiao-tse; Huang Yi-cheng; Ke Hsiang-shuo	Men's team	—N/a	Ecuador; W 8.982–8.249	8.866	3rd place, bronze medalist(s)
Hsu Yu-jan	Women's individual	Niclin (FRA); W 8.599–8.516	Reclusado (USA); L 8.916–9.133	Did not advance	9
Chen Hsin-ya; Kuo Yen-yu; Yang Chang-ying	Women's team	—N/a	Bye	8.849	1st place, gold medalist(s)
Wang Syu-fan; Chien Shiang-ling	Mixed team	Bye	Hong Kong; W 8.649–8.466	8.249	7

== Tennis ==
=== Singles ===
Player	Event	Round of 128	Round of 64	Round of 32	Round of 16	Quarter-finals	Semi-finals	Final	Rank
Player	Event	Opponent score	Opponent score	Opponent score	Opponent score	Opponent score	Opponent score	Opponent score	Rank
Cheng Yan-cheng	Men's	Bye	Jin (USA); W 2–0	Simakin (AIN); L 0–2	Did not advance				17
Chang Tzu-li	Men's	Bye	de Gabriele (MLT); L 1–2	Did not advance					33
Lin Fang-an	Women's	—N/a	Chewe (ZAM); W 2–0	Dittmann (GER); L 1–2	Did not advance				17
Yang Ya-yi	Women's	—N/a	Söke (TUR); W 2–0	Dmitrichenko (KAZ); L 0–2	Did not advance				17

=== Doubles ===
Player	Event	Round of 32	Round of 16	Quarter-finals	Semi-finals	Final	Rank
Player	Event	Opponent score	Opponent score	Opponent score	Opponent score	Opponent score	Rank
Chen Yan-cheng; Lo Yi-jui	Men's	Jin / Pham (AUS); L 0–2	Did not advance				17
Li Yu-yun; Lin Fang-an	Women's	Bye	de Liborio / Oliveira (POR); W 2–0	Dittmann / Herrmann (GER); W 2–0	Ibragimova / Zaytseva (AIN); W 2–0	Kajuru / Yamaguchi (JPN); L 1–2	2nd place, silver medalist(s)
Lo Yi-jui; Lee Ya-hsin	Mixed	Simonov / Toto (GER); L 1–2	Did not advance				17

=== Team ===
Event	Results				Total	Rank
Men's	MS	Chang Tzu-li	3R	0	0	29
Men's	MS	Chang Tzu-li	2R	0	0	29
Men's	MD	Chen Yan-cheng; Lo Yi-jui	1R	0	0	29
Men's	XD	Lo Yi-jui; Lee Ya-hsin	1R	0	0	29
Women's	WS	Lin Fang-an	2R	0	40	6
Women's	WS	Yang Ya-yi	2R	0	40	6
Women's	WD	Li Yu-yun; Lin Fang-an	F	40	40	6
Women's	XD	Lo Yi-jui; Lee Ya-hsin	1R	0	40	6

== Volleyball ==
=== Beach volleyball ===
Player	Event	Preliminary round				Rounf of 16	Quarter-finals	Semi-finals	Final	Rank
Player	Event	Opponent score	Opponent score	Opponent score	Rank	Opponent score	Opponent score	Opponent score	Opponent score	Rank
Lin Zheng-xian; Lin Jiun-jie	Men's	Bulgačs / Rinkevičs (LAT); L 0–2	McManaway / Sadlier (NZL); L 0–2	Denilson / Wesley (BRA); L 0–2	4	Did not advance				
Chen An-ting; Lin Chiao-an	Women's	Salinda / Patcharaporn (THA); L 0–2	Ditta / Sestini (ITA); WD	Juana / Sara (COL); WD	4	Did not advance				

=== Indoor ===
Summary

Team	Event	Preliminary round				Quarter-finals	5th/8th placing	5th placing	Rank
Team	Event	Opponent score	Opponent score	Opponent score	Rank	Opponent score	Opponent score	Opponent score	Rank
Chinese Taipei men	Men's tournament	Australia (AUS); L 1–3	Brazil (BRA); L 2–3	Portugal (POR); W 3–1	2 Q	Poland (POL); L 1–3	Germany (GER); W 3–1	Czech Republic (CZE); L 1–3	6
Chinese Taipei women	Women's tournament	Australia (AUS); W 3–0	Italy (ITA); L 0–3	United States (USA); W 3–1	2 Q	Japan (JPN); L 0–3	China (CHN); W 3–2	Poland (POL); L 1–3	6

==== Men's tournament ====
Team roster

Head coach: Huang Hung-yu

- 1 Chang Yu-chen (c) OH
- 4 Wen Yi-kai OH
- 5 Lin Chien S
- 7 Chen Jie-ting S
- 9 Kan Mao-hung MB
- 11 Chen En-de OP
- 12 Liu Yu-lin OH
- 14 Chang Yu-sheng OP
- 15 Wang Ping-hsun MB
- 16 Li Chun-yu MB
- 19 Chen You-cheng L
- 20 Li Yun OH

Preliminary round – Pool A

Pos	Team	Pld	W	L	Pts	SW	SL	SR	SPW	SPL	SPR	Qualification
1	Brazil	3	3	0	8	9	4	2.250	303	271	1.118	Quarterfinals
2	Chinese Taipei	3	1	2	4	6	7	0.857	306	304	1.007	Quarterfinals
3	Australia	3	1	2	4	6	7	0.857	285	307	0.928	
4	Portugal	3	1	2	2	5	8	0.625	290	302	0.960	

Source: Rhine-Ruhr 2025

17 July 2025; 11:00	Chinese Taipei	1–3	Australia	Sportforum Hohenschönhausen, Germany; Attendance: 103; Referees: Pedro Pereira (POR), Jorge Erazo (COL)
17 July 2025; 11:00	(23–25, 22–25, 30–28, 24–26); Report			Sportforum Hohenschönhausen, Germany; Attendance: 103; Referees: Pedro Pereira (POR), Jorge Erazo (COL)

18 July 2025; 14:00	Chinese Taipei	2–3	Brazil	Max-Schmeling-Halle, Germany; Attendance: 121; Referees: Misael Galindo (COL), Matthew Van Raalte (CAN)
18 July 2025; 14:00	(23–25, 25–21, 25–23, 23–25, 12–15); Report			Max-Schmeling-Halle, Germany; Attendance: 121; Referees: Misael Galindo (COL), Matthew Van Raalte (CAN)

19 July 2025; 14:00	Portugal	1–3	Chinese Taipei	Sportforum Hohenschönhausen, Germany; Attendance: 125; Referees: Matthew Van Raalte (CAN), Doszhan Ualkhanov (KAZ)
19 July 2025; 14:00	(26–28, 25–21, 17–25, 23–25); Report			Sportforum Hohenschönhausen, Germany; Attendance: 125; Referees: Matthew Van Raalte (CAN), Doszhan Ualkhanov (KAZ)

Knockout stage

21 July 2025; 14:00	Poland	3–1	Chinese Taipei	Sportforum Hohenschönhausen, Germany; Attendance: 52; Referees: Yasuo Chiyonobu (JPN), Brian Charles (TTO)
21 July 2025; 14:00	(25–18, 23–25, 25–20, 25–20); Report			Sportforum Hohenschönhausen, Germany; Attendance: 52; Referees: Yasuo Chiyonobu (JPN), Brian Charles (TTO)

22 July 2025; 14:00	Germany	1–3	Chinese Taipei	Sportforum Hohenschönhausen, Germany; Attendance: 50; Referees: Predrag Balandžić (SRB), José Muñoz (CHI)
22 July 2025; 14:00	(20–25, 25–17, 26–28, 16–25); Report			Sportforum Hohenschönhausen, Germany; Attendance: 50; Referees: Predrag Balandžić (SRB), José Muñoz (CHI)

23 July 2025; 14:00	Czech Republic	3–1	Chinese Taipei	Max-Schmeling-Halle, Germany; Attendance: 125; Referees: Pedro Pereira (POR), Misael Galindo (COL)
23 July 2025; 14:00	(20–25, 28–26, 25–17, 25–17); Report			Max-Schmeling-Halle, Germany; Attendance: 125; Referees: Pedro Pereira (POR), Misael Galindo (COL)

==== Women's tournament ====
Team roster

Head coach: Teng Yen-min

- 1 Lin Liang-tai OH
- 4 Chen Li-jung S
- 6 Lin Chi-jung L
- 7 Tsai Yu-chun OH
- 9 Kan Ko-hui (c) MB
- 10 Hsu Wan-yun OH
- 11 Yeh Yu-wen MB
- 13 Chen Chieh OP
- 16 Hu Xiao-pei MB
- 17 Liu Shuang-ling OH
- 19 Chen Ting-ru S
- 21 Chang Yi-chi OP

Preliminary round – Pool D

Pos	Team	Pld	W	L	Pts	SW	SL	SR	SPW	SPL	SPR	Qualification
1	Italy	3	3	0	9	9	0	MAX	225	127	1.772	Quarterfinals
2	Chinese Taipei	3	2	1	6	6	4	1.500	220	202	1.089	Quarterfinals
3	United States	3	1	2	3	4	6	0.667	208	231	0.900	
4	Australia	3	0	3	0	0	9	0.000	133	226	0.588	

Source: Rhine-Ruhr 2025

16 July 2025; 10:00	Australia	0–3	Chinese Taipei	Horst-Korber-Sportzentrum, Germany; Attendance: 0 Referees: Väctor Bagala (ARG), Vanya Parvanova (BUL)
16 July 2025; 10:00	(13–25, 10–25, 18–25); Report			Horst-Korber-Sportzentrum, Germany; Attendance: 0 Referees: Väctor Bagala (ARG), Vanya Parvanova (BUL)

17 July 2025; 20:00	Chinese Taipei	0–3	Italy	Großsporthalle Hämmerlingstraße, Germany; Attendance: 25; Referees: Predrag Balandžić (SRB), Boris Mbang (CMR)
17 July 2025; 20:00	(15–25, 19–25, 15–25); Report			Großsporthalle Hämmerlingstraße, Germany; Attendance: 25; Referees: Predrag Balandžić (SRB), Boris Mbang (CMR)

18 July 2025; 17:00	United States	1–3	Chinese Taipei	Großsporthalle Hämmerlingstraße, Germany; Attendance: 100; Referees: Mauro Goitre (ITA), Predrag Balandžić (SRB)
18 July 2025; 17:00	(23–25, 25–21, 19–25, 19–25); Report			Großsporthalle Hämmerlingstraße, Germany; Attendance: 100; Referees: Mauro Goitre (ITA), Predrag Balandžić (SRB)

Knockout stage

20 July 2025; 11:00	Japan	3–0	Chinese Taipei	Max-Schmeling-Halle, Germany; Attendance: 120; Referees: Kenia Nieves (USA), Mahender Saharan (IND)
20 July 2025; 11:00	(25–22, 25–21, 25–20); Report			Max-Schmeling-Halle, Germany; Attendance: 120; Referees: Kenia Nieves (USA), Mahender Saharan (IND)

21 July 2025; 18:00	Chinese Taipei	3–2	China	Großsporthalle Hämmerlingstraße, Germany; Attendance: 100; Referees: Misael Galindo (COL), Kenia Nieves (USA)
21 July 2025; 18:00	(23–25, 22–25, 25–19, 25–23, 15–9); Report			Großsporthalle Hämmerlingstraße, Germany; Attendance: 100; Referees: Misael Galindo (COL), Kenia Nieves (USA)

22 July 2025; 14:00	Poland	3–1	Chinese Taipei	Max-Schmeling-Halle, Germany; Attendance: 50; Referees: Theodora Kyriopoulou (ISR), Julian Coburn (AUS)
22 July 2025; 14:00	(25–23, 21–25, 26–24, 25–20); Report			Max-Schmeling-Halle, Germany; Attendance: 50; Referees: Theodora Kyriopoulou (ISR), Julian Coburn (AUS)
