= Basketball at the 2025 Summer World University Games – Men's tournament =

Men's basketball at the Universiade
- Venue: Essen, Duisburg, Hagen
- Dates: 19–26 July 2025
- Teams: 16

Medalists
1st place, gold medalist(s)		Brazil
2nd place, silver medalist(s)		United States
3rd place, bronze medalist(s)		Lithuania

The men's tournament in basketball at the 2025 Summer Universiade in Rhine-Ruhr, Germany was held from 19 to 26 July 2025.

== Preliminary round ==
=== Group A ===
Pos	Team	Pld	W	L	PF	PA	PD	Pts	
1	Germany	3	3	0	244	189	+55	6	Qualification for quarterfinals
2	Finland	3	2	1	273	207	+66	5	Qualification for quarterfinals
3	Chinese Taipei	3	1	2	222	247	−25	4	Qualification for placing 9-16
4	Chile	3	0	3	153	249	−96	3	Qualification for placing 9-16

Source: rhineruhr2025.com

19 July 2025
17:30

Report

Chile	51–95	Finland
Scoring by quarter: 17–18, 13–28, 12–22, 9–27
Pts: Moraga, Saez 13; Rebs: Moraga 6 Asts: Moraga 4		Pts: Tainamo 17; Rebs: Skyttä 8 Asts: Nordberg 3

Grugahalle, Essen
Referees: Juozas Barkauskas (LTU), Haruga Iwai (JPN), John Lester Celeste (PHI)

19 July 2025
20:00

Report

Germany	83–73	Chinese Taipei
Scoring by quarter: 20–21, 17–15, 25–25, 21–12
Pts: Rataj 21; Rebs: Saffer 19; Asts: Baggette 5		Pts: Lin 20; Rebs: Yu, Lin 6 Asts: Sung, Hsu 5

Grugahalle, Essen
Referees: Iván Huck Braner (ARG), Alin Faur (ROU), Lauren Niemiera (USA)

20 July 2025
20:00

Report

Chile	54–72	Chinese Taipei
Scoring by quarter: 17–13, 15–10, 14–21, 8–28
Pts: Saez 13; Rebs: Aguilera 9 Asts: Aguilera 4		Pts: Sung 22; Rebs: Yu 9 Asts: Yu 7

Sportpark am Hallo, Essen
Referees: Einārs Tukišs (LAT), Danilo Ariel Molina (ARG), Sergio Kassab (LBN)

20 July 2025
20:00

Report

Germany	79–68	Finland
Scoring by quarter: 30–15, 20–13, 16–25, 13–15
Pts: Tischler 22; Rebs: Saffer 11; Asts: Baggette 5		Pts: Tahvanainen 24; Rebs: Jokela 10; Asts: Nordberg 5

Grugahalle, Essen
Referees: Juozas Barkauskas (LTU), Tijmen Last (NED), Ewa Matuszewska (POL)

21 July 2025
14:30

Report

Finland	110–77	Chinese Taipei
Scoring by quarter: 32–16, 28–20, 32–21, 18–20
Pts: Tainamo 26; Rebs: Tainamo 9 Asts: Suokas, Lindberg, Permanto 5		Pts: Sung 17; Rebs: Chen 6 Asts: Hsu 6

Ischelandhalle, Hagen
Referees: Alin Faur (ROU), Prem Kumar Kanneboina (IND), Nicolas Zivieri (BRA)

21 July 2025
20:00

Report

Germany	82–48	Chile
Scoring by quarter: 16–10, 21–14, 23–14, 22–10
Pts: Abra 17; Rebs: Entezami 13; Asts: Baggette 6		Pts: Pereira 17; Rebs: Moraga, Alvarado 4 Asts: Alvarado, Aguilera 2

Ischelandhalle, Hagen
Referees: Martin Kučírek (CZE), Balázs Mészáros (HUN), Alexandra-Ioana Stan (ROU)

=== Group B ===
Pos	Team	Pld	W	L	PF	PA	PD	Pts	
1	United States	3	3	0	280	194	+86	6	Qualification for quarterfinals
2	Romania	3	2	1	253	236	+17	5	Qualification for quarterfinals
3	Latvia	3	1	2	269	219	+50	4	Qualification for placing 9-16
4	India	3	0	3	180	333	−153	3	Qualification for placing 9-16

Source: rhineruhr2025.com

19 July 2025
17:30

Report

Romania	80–78	Latvia
Scoring by quarter: 36–44, 0–0, 14–19, 30–15
Pts: Dorneanu 18; Rebs: Colceag 10; Asts: Pătru 3		Pts: Aleksandrovs 21; Rebs: Aleksandrovs 12; Asts: Briedis 5

Sportpark am Hallo, Essen
Referees: Danilo Ariel Molina (ARG), Milita Stalaučinskaitė (LTU), Maximilian Meiler (GER)

19 July 2025
20:00

Report

United States	111–52	India
Scoring by quarter: 32–12, 32–14, 29–11, 18–15
Pts: Williams 18; Rebs: Aletan 10; Asts: White 6		Pts: Ishan 14; Rebs: Yadav 4 Asts: five players of 1 each

Ischelandhalle, Hagen
Referees: Martin Kučírek (CZE), Gustavo Edson Mathias (BRA), Tobias Kazda (GER)

20 July 2025
17:30

Report

United States	84–77	Latvia
Scoring by quarter: 32–24, 14–15, 18–13, 20–25
Pts: Agbim 20; Rebs: Skillings 11; Asts: Agbim 3		Pts: Briedis 17; Rebs: Aleksandrovs 9 Asts: Briedis 5

Grugahalle, Essen
Referees: Elias Anttonen (FIN), Nicolas Zivieri (BRA), Alexander Moskovic (GER)

20 July 2025
17:30

Report

Romania	108–73	India
Scoring by quarter: 34–17, 18–14, 26–18, 30–24
Pts: Dorneanu 21; Rebs: Colceag 5 Asts: Lapuste 6		Pts: Sharma, Ishan 16; Rebs: Shekhawat, Ishan 6 Asts: Sharma 3

Ischelandhalle, Hagen
Referees: Nermin Hodžić (BIH), Veronika Vávrová (CZE), Hwang Ji-sun (KOR)

21 July 2025
14:30

Report

India	55–114	Latvia
Scoring by quarter: 19–27, 20–23, 6–29, 10–35
Pts: Ishan 17; Rebs: Ishan 5 Asts: Yadav 3		Pts: Meinarts 21; Rebs: Baumanis 11; Asts: Lucis 5

Grugahalle, Essen
Referees: Tomasz Wit Langowski (POL), Claudio Andrés Osorio Vargas (CHI), Danilo Ariel Molina (ARG)

21 July 2025
17:30

Report

Romania	65–85	United States
Scoring by quarter: 15–26, 17–19, 21–26, 12–14
Pts: Patru 14; Rebs: Cotoara, Antonescu, Colceag 4 Asts: Patru 4		Pts: Agbim 22; Rebs: Skillings 9 Asts: Agbim, Williams 5

Ischelandhalle, Hagen
Referees: Ioannis Agrafiotis (GRE), Karol Tomasz Kowalski (FIN), Maximilian Meiler (GER)

=== Group C ===
Pos	Team	Pld	W	L	PF	PA	PD	Pts	
1	Brazil	3	3	0	260	190	+70	6	Qualification for quarterfinals
2	Czech Republic	3	2	1	241	183	+58	5	Qualification for quarterfinals
3	Poland	3	1	2	203	219	−16	4	Qualification for placing 9-16
4	Philippines	3	0	3	172	284	−112	3	Qualification for placing 9-16

Source: rhineruhr2025.com

19 July 2025
17:30

Report

Czech Republic	71–62	Poland
Scoring by quarter: 17–15, 22–18, 15–13, 17–16
Pts: M. Svoboda 34; Rebs: Sýkora 14; Asts: Burda, Sýkora 4		Pts: Piśla 15; Rebs: Kempa, Duda 7 Asts: Gordon 5

Walter-Schädlich-Halle, Duisburg
Referees: Diogo Martins (POR), Nermin Hodžić (BIH), Joshua Holtermann (GER)

19 July 2025
20:00

Report

Brazil	105–58	Philippines
Scoring by quarter: 27–24, 32–6, 21–21, 25–7
Pts: Cardoso 17; Rebs: Cardoso 9 Asts: Borges 8		Pts: Cuenco 11; Rebs: Nitura 8 Asts: Nitura 5

Walter-Schädlich-Halle, Duisburg
Referees: Ioannis Agrafiotis (GRE), Alexandra-Ioana Stan (ROU), Dalibor Šušteršić (SRB)

20 July 2025
20:00

Report

Brazil	81–62	Poland
Scoring by quarter: 26–15, 18–14, 15–18, 22–15
Pts: Souza 23; Rebs: Neptune 7 Asts: Barbosa, Neptune, Silva 3		Pts: Piśla 18; Rebs: Piśla 5 Asts: Łałak, Kempa 2

Ischelandhalle, Hagen
Referees: Carsten Straube (GER), Iván Huck Braner (ARG), Balázs Mészáros (HUN)

20 July 2025
20:00

Report

Czech Republic	100–47	Philippines
Scoring by quarter: 25–13, 24–12, 28–7, 23–15
Pts: M. Svoboda 18; Rebs: Sýkora 8 Asts: Sýkora 5		Pts: Nitura 9 Rebs: Lazarte 5 Asts: Igliane, Cuenco 4

Walter-Schädlich-Halle, Duisburg
Referees: John Conley Jr (USA), Chuang Chih-chun (TPE), Joshua Holtermann (GER)

21 July 2025
17:30

Report

Philippines	67–79	Poland
Scoring by quarter: 13–23, 16–19, 22–17, 16–20
Pts: Cuenco 14; Rebs: Nitura 7 Asts: Nitura, Sapasap 3		Pts: Lis 20; Rebs: Kempa 13; Asts: Gordon 4

Grugahalle, Essen
Referees: Einārs Tukišs (LAT), Elias Anttonen (FIN), Mona Kienast (GER)

21 July 2025
21:45

Report

Czech Republic	70–74	Brazil
Scoring by quarter: 19–14, 17–18, 16–18, 18–24
Pts: Vlk 19; Rebs: Sýkora 6 Asts: Sýkora 5		Pts: Santos 18; Rebs: Cardoso 6 Asts: Souza 5

Grugahalle, Essen
Referees: Iván Huck Braner (ARG), Lauren Niemiera (USA), Nermin Hodžić (BIH)

=== Group D ===
Pos	Team	Pld	W	L	PF	PA	PD	Pts	
1	Lithuania	3	3	0	269	200	+69	6	Qualification for quarterfinals
2	South Korea	3	2	1	252	219	+33	5	Qualification for quarterfinals
3	Lebanon	3	1	2	224	242	−18	4	Qualification for placing 9-16
4	Argentina	3	0	3	146	230	−84	3	Qualification for placing 9-16

Source: rhineruhr2025.com

19 July 2025
12:00

Report

Argentina	50–86	South Korea
Scoring by quarter: 10–23, 14–21, 14–26, 12–16
Pts: Copesky 17; Rebs: Brüel 6 Asts: Kelman 2		Pts: Lee Jy 19; Rebs: Lee Dg 7 Asts: Park Sj 4

Ischelandhalle, Hagen
Referees: Karol Tomasz Kowalski (FIN), John Conley Jr. (USA), Michael Oesterle (GER)

19 July 2025
20:00

Report

Lithuania	101–79	Lebanon
Scoring by quarter: 24–21, 32–22, 25–18, 20–18
Pts: Kancleris 16; Rebs: Nemeikša 7 Asts: Stenionis 12		Pts: Naba 21; Rebs: Makhlouf 8 Asts: Abou Samra, Assi 4

Sporthalle am Hallo, Essen
Referees: Martin Van Hoye (BEL), Yuan Dian-lin (TPE), Milutin Jelenic (GER)

20 July 2025
17:30

Report

Argentina	44–60	Lebanon
Scoring by quarter: 15–13, 8–19, 15–12, 6–16
Pts: Copesky 16; Rebs: Sacchi 7 Asts: Alonso 4		Pts: El Hajj 14; Rebs: Naba 15; Asts: El Hajj 4

Sporthalle am Hallo, Essen
Referees: Alin Faur (ROU), Tomasz Wit Langowski (POL), Maximilian Meiler (GER)

20 July 2025
17:30

Report

Lithuania	84–69	South Korea
Scoring by quarter: 14–20, 19–16, 22–14, 29–19
Pts: Stenionis 24; Rebs: Mockus 15; Asts: Stenionis 7		Pts: Yun Kc 18; Rebs: Lee Dg 6 Asts: Park Sj 5

Walter-Schädlich-Halle, Duisburg
Referees: Gustavo Edson Mathias (BRA), Prem Kumar Kanneboina (IND), Mona Kienast (GER)

21 July 2025
12:00

Report

Argentina	52–84	Lithuania
Scoring by quarter: 18–18, 14–25, 9–20, 11–21
Pts: Sacchi 15; Rebs: Copesky, Sacchi 4 Asts: Copesky 2		Pts: Leščiauskas 20; Rebs: Kulieša 10; Asts: Kancleris 4

Grugahalle, Essen
Referees: John Conley Jr. (USA), Diogo Martins (POR), Haruga Iwai (JPN)

21 July 2025
12:00

Report

Lebanon	85–97	South Korea
Scoring by quarter: 22–27, 31–23, 13–21, 19–26
Pts: El Jamal 22; Rebs: Saad, El Jamal 8 Asts: Abou Samra 5		Pts: Lee Kt 18; Rebs: Park Mb 8 Asts: Park Mb 7

Ischelandhalle, Hagen
Referees: Juozas Barkauskas (LTU), Gustavo Edson Mathias (BRA), Milita Stalaučinskaitė (LTU)

== Playoff brackets ==
=== Placing 1-8 ===
Quarterfinals
23 July
A1 Germany	78
B2 Romania	62
23 July
C1 Brazil	99
D2 South Korea	73
23 July
A2 Finland	83
B1 United States	102
23 July
C2 Czech Republic	47
D1 Lithuania	78

Semifinals
24 July
A1 Germany	78
C1 Brazil	83
24 July
B1 United States	72
D1 Lithuania	64

Final
26 July
C1 Brazil	94
B1 United States	88
3rd place
26 July
A1 Germany	70
D1 Lithuania	80

=== Placing 5-8 ===
5th–8th place semifinals
24 July
B2 Romania	72
D2 South Korea	94
24 July
A2 Finland	65
C2 Czech Republic	74

5th place
26 July
D2 South Korea	65
C2 Czech Republic	90
7th place
26 July
B2 Romania	57
A2 Finland	77

=== Placing 9-16 ===
9th–16th place quarterfinals
23 July
A3 Chinese Taipei	102
B4 India	77
23 July
C3 Poland	93
D4 Argentina	46
23 July
A4 Chile	61
B3 Latvia	86
23 July
C4 Philippines	67
D3 Lebanon	73

9–12th place semifinals
24 July
A3 Chinese Taipei	87
C3 Poland	89
24 July
B3 Latvia	69
D3 Lebanon	79

9th place
26 July
C3 Poland	72
D3 Lebanon	75
11th place
26 July
A3 Chinese Taipei	91
B3 Latvia	97

=== Placing 13-16 ===
13th–16th place semifinals
24 July
B4 India	52
D4 Argentina	79
24 July
A4 Chile	69
C4 Philippines	77

13th place
26 July
D4 Argentina	84
C4 Philippines	71
15th place
26 July
B4 India	66
A4 Chile	78

== Playoff results ==
=== Quarterfinals ===
23 July 2025
20:00

Report

Germany	78–62	Romania
Scoring by quarter: 22–17, 14–17, 22–20, 20–8
Pts: Rataj 27; Rebs: Rataj, Steinfeld 10; Asts: Baggette 4		Pts: Patru 13; Rebs: Colceag 6 Asts: Rotaru, Lapuste, Axinte 2

Ischelandhalle, Hagen
Referees: Iván Huck Braner (ARG), Karol Tomasz Kowalski (FIN), Milita Stalaučinskaitė (LTU)

23 July 2025
20:00

Report

Brazil	99–73	South Korea
Scoring by quarter: 20–22, 42–17, 25–15, 32–19
Pts: Silva 20; Rebs: Santos 8 Asts: Borges 7		Pts: Lee Dg 12; Rebs: Kang Jh 6 Asts: Park Mb 6

Sporthalle am Hallo, Essen
Referees: Juozas Barkauskas (LTU), Alin Faur (ROU), Tomasz Wit Langowski (POL)

23 July 2025
17:30

Report

Finland	83–102	United States
Scoring by quarter: 19–26, 22–32, 23–26, 19–18
Pts: Suokas 16; Rebs: Tainamo 7 Asts: Nordberg 3		Pts: Agbim 23; Rebs: Skillings 10; Asts: Skillings, White 5

Ischelandhalle, Hagen
Referees: Ioannis Agrafiotis (GRE), Nermin Hodžić (BIH), Claudio Andrés Osorio Vargas (CHI)

23 July 2025
17:30

Report

Czech Republic	47–78	Lithuania
Scoring by quarter: 10–17, 10–25, 12–21, 15–15
Pts: Bohm 9 Rebs: Noumeros 8 Asts: Bohm 4		Pts: Stenionis, Kulieša 12; Rebs: Kancleris, Mockus, Mačijauskas 5 Asts: Stenionis 5

Sporthalle am Hallo, Essen
Referees: John Conley Jr. (USA), Carsten Straube (GER), Danilo Ariel Molina (ARG)

=== Semifinals ===
24 July 2025
17:30

Report

Germany	78–83	Brazil
Scoring by quarter: 23–20, 20–30, 26–9, 9–24
Pts: Baggette 19; Rebs: Herzog 6 Asts: Baggette, Herzog 3		Pts: Barbosa, Cardoso 15; Rebs: Cardoso 6 Asts: Borges 7

Grugahalle, Essen
Referees: John Conley Jr. (USA), Danilo Ariel Molina (ARG), Veronika Vávrová (CZE)

24 July 2025
20:00

Report

United States	72–64	Lithuania
Scoring by quarter: 16–22, 15–13, 19–22, 22–7
Pts: Skillings 17; Rebs: Skillings 13; Asts: Agbim 5		Pts: Nemeikša 16; Rebs: Kancleris 11; Asts: Stenionis 8

Grugahalle, Essen
Referees: Ioannis Agrafiotis (GRE), Alin Faur (ROU), Martin Van Hoye (BEL)

=== Final ===
26 July 2025
20:00

Report

Brazil	94–88 (OT)	United States
Scoring by quarter: 20–17, 9–26, 16–24, 35–13, Overtime: 14–8
Pts: Borges 25; Rebs: Santana 9 Asts: Santos 6		Pts: Agbim 30; Rebs: Skillings 12; Asts: Skillings 3

Grugahalle, Essen
Referees: Carsten Straube (GER), Ivan Huck Braner (ARG), Juozas Barkauskas (LTU)

=== 3rd place ===
26 July 2025
17:30

Report

Germany	70–80	Lithuania
Scoring by quarter: 11–18, 9–21, 21–22, 29–19
Pts: Tischler 21; Rebs: Tischler, Rataj 6 Asts: Herzog 4		Pts: Nemeikša 22; Rebs: Kancleris 9 Asts: Stenionis 10

Grugahalle, Essen
Referees: Ioannis Agrafiotis (GRE), Lauren Niemiera (USA), Einārs Tukišs (LAT)

=== 5th–8th place semifinals ===
24 July 2025
20:00

Report

Romania	72–94	South Korea
Scoring by quarter: 23–20, 9–32, 27–26, 13–16
Pts: Dorneanu 17; Rebs: Dorneanu, Colceag 5 Asts: Pătru 6		Pts: Lee Dg 27; Rebs: Lee Dg 9 Asts: Kang Sw 7

Ischelandhalle, Hagen
Referees: Juozas Barkauskas (LTU), Nermin Hodžić (BIH), Karol Tomasz Kowalski (FIN)

24 July 2025
17:30

Report

Finland	65–74	Czech Republic
Scoring by quarter: 15–21, 17–17, 17–21, 16–15
Pts: Tainamo 14; Rebs: Tainamo 12; Asts: Nordberg 7		Pts: Bohm 18; Rebs: M. Svoboda 10; Asts: Šafárik, Sýkora 3

Ischelandhalle, Hagen
Referees: Carsten Straube (GER), Diogo Martins (POR), Imran Ali Baig (IND)

=== 5th place ===
26 July 2025
14:30

Report

South Korea	65–90	Czech Republic
Scoring by quarter: 19–15, 12–25, 19–17, 15–33
Pts: Lee Jy 18; Rebs: Lee Dg 6 Asts: Park Sj 3		Pts: M. Svoboda 19; Rebs: Sýkora, Š. Svoboda, M. Svoboda 9 Asts: Sýkora 10

Grugahalle, Essen
Referees: Diogo Martins (POR), Elias Anttonen (FIN), Karol Tomasz Kowalski (FIN)

=== 7th place ===
26 July 2025
12:00

Report

Romania	57–77	Finland
Scoring by quarter: 22–17, 11–25, 15–16, 9–19
Pts: Antonescu 12; Rebs: Gribinic 6 Asts: Lapuste, Antonescu, Năstruț 2		Pts: Vaara 21; Rebs: Skyttä 7 Asts: Tahvanainen 7

Grugahalle, Essen
Referees: John Conley Jr. (USA), Martin Kučírek (CZE), Claudio Andrés Osorio Vargas (CHI)

=== 9th–16th place quarterfinals ===
23 July 2025
14:30

Report

Chinese Taipei	102–77	India
Scoring by quarter: 32–20, 17–13, 28–22, 25–22
Pts: Lee Yc 16; Rebs: Hu Ch 10; Asts: Hsu Tc 7		Pts: Billa 17; Rebs: Ishan 6 Asts: Billa 6

Ischelandhalle, Hagen
Referees: Diogo Martins (POR), Martin Kučírek (CZE), Milutin Jenić (GER)

23 July 2025
14:30

Report

Poland	93–46	Argentina
Scoring by quarter: 15–11, 24–13, 36–17, 18–5
Pts: Gordon 17; Rebs: Kempa 9 Asts: Gordon 9		Pts: Sacchi 13; Rebs: Brüel 5 Asts: Hentschel 4

Sporthalle am Hallo, Essen
Referees: Nicolas Zivieri (BRA), Haruga Iwai (JPN), Michael Oesterle (GER)

23 July 2025
12:00

Report

Chile	61–86	Latvia
Scoring by quarter: 14–21, 14–23, 18–20, 15–22
Pts: Jorquera 18; Rebs: Moraga 8 Asts: Figueroa 5		Pts: Aleksandrovs, Bērze 18; Rebs: Aleksandrovs 10; Asts: Briedis 6

Ischelandhalle, Hagen
Referees: Martin Van Hoye (BEL), Tijmen Last (NED), Maximilian Meiler (GER)

23 July 2025
12:00

Report

Philippines	67–73	Lebanon
Scoring by quarter: 14–26, 17–14, 22–14, 14–19
Pts: Cuenco 27; Rebs: Gulapa 10; Asts: Recto 7		Pts: El Jamal 26; Rebs: El Jamal 9 Asts: Abou Samra, El Hajj 6

Sporthalle am Hallo, Essen
Referees: Gustavo Edson Mathias (BRA), Chuang Chih-chun (TPE), Joshua Holtermann (GER)

=== 9–12th place semifinals ===
24 July 2025
14:30

Report

Chinese Taipei	87–89	Poland
Scoring by quarter: 25–22, 19–24, 20–21, 23–22
Pts: Hsu Tc 17; Rebs: Yu Ac, Hu Ch 7 Asts: Hsu Tc 5		Pts: Andrzejewski 21; Rebs: Kempa 11; Asts: Gordon 6

Grugahalle, Essen
Referees: Nicolas Zivieri (BRA), Alexander Moskovic (GER), Haruga Iwai (JPN)

24 July 2025
14:30

Report

Latvia	69–79	Lebanon
Scoring by quarter: 34–16, 9–16, 10–25, 16–22
Pts: Bērze 18; Rebs: Aleksandrovs 11; Asts: Lucis 5		Pts: Makhlouf 24; Rebs: Abou Samra, Makhlouf 10; Asts: Abou Samra, Assi 5

Ischelandhalle, Hagen
Referees: Ivan Huck Braner (ARG), Prem Kumar Kanneboina (IND), Tobias Kazda (GER)

=== 9th place ===
26 July 2025
14:30

Report

Poland	72–75	Lebanon
Scoring by quarter: 23–14, 15–20, 16–24, 18–17
Pts: Siembiga 19; Rebs: Kempa, Duda 7 Asts: Kempa 4		Pts: Abou Samra 15; Rebs: Saad 11; Asts: Abou Samra, Rizk 3

Sporthalle am Hallo, Essen
Referees: Danilo Ariel Molina (ARG), Tijmen Last (NED), Joshua Holtermann (GER)

=== 11th place ===
26 July 2025
12:00

Report

Chinese Taipei	91–97	Latvia
Scoring by quarter: 26–24, 28–14, 21–21, 16–38
Pts: Chen Fan Py 26; Rebs: Wu Zk, Hsu Tc 5 Asts: Hsu Tc 9		Pts: Aleksandrovs 24; Rebs: Aleksandrovs 8 Asts: Briedis 7

Sporthalle am Hallo, Essen
Referees: Nicolas Zivieri (BRA), Alexandra-Ioana Stan (ROU), Nermin Hodžić (BIH)

=== 13th–16th place semifinals ===
24 July 2025
12:00

Report

India	52–79	Argentina
Scoring by quarter: 10–29, 16–17, 10–16, 16–17
Pts: Billa, Ishan 13; Rebs: Yadav 7 Asts: Sharma, Chundawat 3		Pts: Sacchi 25; Rebs: Sacchi 12; Asts: Kelman 8

Grugahalle, Essen
Referees: Tijmen Last (NED), Mariajesús Rocio González Chaparro (CHI), Lin Yuan-dian (TPE)

24 July 2025
12:00

Report

Chile	69–77	Philippines
Scoring by quarter: 23–20, 17–21, 19–23, 10–13
Pts: Rivera 18; Rebs: Saez 5 Asts: Villagrán 4		Pts: Delos Reyes 22; Rebs: Delos Reyes 11; Asts: Iglane, Sapasap 4

Ischelandhalle, Hagen
Referees: Einārs Tukišs (LAT), Chuang Chih-chun (TPE), Anna Sofie Englisch (GER)

=== 13th place ===
26 July 2025
14:30

Report

Argentina	84–71	Philippines
Scoring by quarter: 13–19, 19–22, 21–10, 31–20
Pts: Copesky 33; Rebs: Sacchi 11; Asts: Copesky 8		Pts: Cuenco, Delos Reyes 14; Rebs: Cuenco, Nitura, Sapasap 7 Asts: Cuenco, Nitura 4

Walter-Schädlich-Halle, Duisburg
Referees: Alin Faur (ROU), Maximilian Meiler (GER), Anna Sofie Englisch (GER)

=== 15th place ===
26 July 2025
12:00

Report

India	66–78	Chile
Scoring by quarter: 21–18, 10–15, 18–19, 17–26
Pts: Sharma 17; Rebs: Sharma 13; Asts: Sharma 8		Pts: Alvarado 16; Rebs: Pereira 6 Asts: Alvarado 5

Walter-Schädlich-Halle, Duisburg
Referees: Ewa Matuszewska (POL), Gustavo Edson Mathias (BRA), Edris Naim (GER)

== Final standings ==
Place	Team	Record
1st place, gold medalist(s)	Brazil	6–0
2nd place, silver medalist(s)	United States	5–1
3rd place, bronze medalist(s)	Lithuania	5–1
4	Germany	4–2
5	Czech Republic	4–2
6	South Korea	3–3
7	Finland	3–3
8	Romania	2–4
9	Lebanon	4–2
10	Poland	3–3
11	Latvia	3–3
12	Chinese Taipei	2–4
13	Argentina	2–4
14	Philippines	1–5
15	Chile	1–5
16	India	0–6
