= Basketball at the 2025 Summer World University Games – Women's tournament =

Women's basketball at the Universiade
- Venue: Essen, Duisburg, Hagen
- Dates: 18–25 July 2025
- Teams: 16

Medalists
1st place, gold medalist(s)		China
2nd place, silver medalist(s)		United States
3rd place, bronze medalist(s)		Hungary

The women's tournament in basketball at the 2025 Summer Universiade in Rhine-Ruhr, Germany was held from 18 to 25 July 2025.

== Preliminary round ==
=== Group A ===
Pos	Team	Pld	W	L	PF	PA	PD	Pts	
1	Finland	3	3	0	284	129	+155	6	Qualification for quarterfinals
2	Czech Republic	3	2	1	295	152	+143	5	Qualification for quarterfinals
3	Argentina	3	1	2	179	262	−83	4	Qualification for placing 9-16
4	India	3	0	3	125	340	−215	3	Qualification for placing 9-16

Source: rhineruhr2025.com

18 July 2025
12:00

Report

India	33–137	Czech Republic
Scoring by quarter: 4–32, 17–39, 5–32, 7–34
Pts: Kunghadkar 13; Rebs: Behal 9 Asts: Srivastava 2		Pts: Nétková 22; Rebs: Fučíková, L. Vydrová, Nétková 7 Asts: M. Žílová, Lišková 5

Grugahalle, Essen
Referees: Alexandra-Ioana Stan (ROU), Balázs Mészáros (HUN), John Lester Celeste (PHI)

18 July 2025
14:30

Report

Finland	101–40	Argentina
Scoring by quarter: 35–9, 14–8, 20–10, 32–13
Pts: Seppälä 16; Rebs: Onnela 9 Asts: Ollilainen, Sandvik 4		Pts: Hentschel 14; Rebs: Bellosta 8 Asts: Usach 2

Grugahalle, Essen
Referees: Ewa Matuszewska (POL), Sergio Kassab (LBN), Tijmen Last (NED)

19 July 2025
12:00

Report

India	57–86	Argentina
Scoring by quarter: 17–22, 16–18, 18–17, 6–29
Pts: Behal 15; Rebs: Behal 13; Asts: Srivastava 4		Pts: Santini 22; Rebs: Santini 10; Asts: Romagnoli 5

Walter-Schädlich-Halle, Duisburg
Referees: Sergio Kassab (LBN), Edris Naim (GER), Anna Sofie Englisch (GER)

19 July 2025
12:00

Report

Finland	66–54	Czech Republic
Scoring by quarter: 20–8, 20–22, 11–12, 15–12
Pts: Kanerva 13; Rebs: Syla 9 Asts: Syla 3		Pts: Hálová 16; Rebs: Fučíková 7 Asts: E. Žílová 6

Sporthalle am Hallo, Essen
Referees: Claudio Andrés Osorio Vargas (CHI), Chuang Chih-chun (TPE), Mona Kienast (GER)

20 July 2025
12:00

Report

Argentina	53–104	Czech Republic
Scoring by quarter: 11–25, 6–30, 17–27, 19–22
Pts: Hentschel 15; Rebs: Briones Pavón 7 Asts: Santini 3		Pts: Ondroušková 19; Rebs: Nétková 9 Asts: Malíková 5

Walter-Schädlich-Halle, Duisburg
Referees: Lauren Niemiera (USA), Milutin Jelenic (GER), Claudio Andrés Osorio Vargas (CHI)

20 July 2025
14:30

Report

India	35–117	Finland
Scoring by quarter: 9–21, 8–32, 16–28, 2–36
Pts: Kunghadkar 9 Rebs: Kunghadkar 5 Asts: Kunghadkar 4		Pts: Kujala 24; Rebs: Seppälä, Syla 8 Asts: Kujala 8

Walter-Schädlich-Halle, Duisburg
Referees: Alexandra-Ioana Stan (ROU), Lin Yuan-dian (TPE), Robert Konopacki (GER)

=== Group B ===
Pos	Team	Pld	W	L	PF	PA	PD	Pts	
1	Poland	3	3	0	217	190	+27	6	Qualification for quarterfinals
2	United States	3	2	1	219	208	+11	5	Qualification for quarterfinals
3	Germany	3	1	2	194	172	+22	4	Qualification for placing 9-16
4	Chinese Taipei	3	0	3	177	237	−60	3	Qualification for placing 9-16

Source: rhineruhr2025.com

18 July 2025
17:30

Report

Chinese Taipei	69–77 (OT)	Poland
Scoring by quarter: 11–17, 21–12, 15–18, 13–13, Overtime: 9–17
Pts: Wang Yt 15; Rebs: Hsiao Yw 7 Asts: Huang Cc 5		Pts: Kulińska 17; Rebs: Kulińska 9 Asts: Wojtala 4

Ischelandhalle, Hagen
Referees: Juozas Barkauskas (LTU), Mariajesús Rocío González Chaparro (CHI), Nermin Hodžić (BIH)

18 July 2025
20:00

Report

Germany	63–69	United States
Scoring by quarter: 16–14, 13–21, 20–11, 14–23
Pts: Belker 15; Rebs: Brennecke 5 Asts: Rosemeyer 4		Pts: Gaston 20; Rebs: Martin 8 Asts: Love 4

Grugahalle, Essen
Referees: Veronika Vávrová (CZE), Danilo Ariel Molina (ARG), Ioannis Agrafiotis (GRE)

19 July 2025
14:30

Report

Germany	50–63	Poland
Scoring by quarter: 14–8, 16–15, 12–18, 8–22
Pts: Gaba, Wittenberg 9 Rebs: Gaba 11; Asts: Eichmeyer, Schiffer 2		Pts: Mielnicka 18; Rebs: Borkowska 13; Asts: Mielnicka 3

Grugahalle, Essen
Referees: Einārs Tukišs (LAT), Imran Ali Baig (IND), Nicolas Zivieri (BRA)

19 July 2025
17:30

Report

Chinese Taipei	68–79	United States
Scoring by quarter: 13–21, 21–18, 16–19, 18–21
Pts: Hsiao Yw 14; Rebs: Yu Ch 7 Asts: Huang Cy 5		Pts: Gaston 20; Rebs: Bristow 10; Asts: Love 5

Ischelandhalle, Hagen
Referees: Tijmen Last (NED), Balázs Mészáros (HUN), Hwang Ji-sun (KOR)

20 July 2025
12:00

Report

United States	71–77	Poland
Scoring by quarter: 18–25, 14–15, 19–23, 20–14
Pts: Gaston 19; Rebs: Bristow 9 Asts: Love 5		Pts: Wojtala 12; Rebs: Borkowska 6 Asts: Mielnicka 3

Grugahalle, Essen
Referees: Ioannis Agrafiotis (GRE), Martin Van Hoye (BEL), Sun Yimiao (CHN)

20 July 2025
14:30

Report

Chinese Taipei	40–81	Germany
Scoring by quarter: 9–24, 8–23, 7–24, 16–10
Pts: Wang Yt 11; Rebs: Yu Ch, Hsiao Yw 5 Asts: Tsai Yl 4		Pts: Wittenberg 16; Rebs: Gaba, Brennecke 6 Asts: Rosemeyer, Gaba, Wittenberg 3

Grugahalle, Essen
Referees: Haruga Iwai (JPN), Martin Kučírek (CZE), Diogo Martins (POR)

=== Group C ===
Pos	Team	Pld	W	L	PF	PA	PD	Pts	
1	Hungary	3	3	0	246	183	+63	6	Qualification for quarterfinals
2	Japan	3	2	1	258	225	+33	5	Qualification for quarterfinals
3	Lithuania	3	1	2	216	239	−23	4	Qualification for placing 9-16
4	Brazil	3	0	3	188	261	−73	3	Qualification for placing 9-16

Source: rhineruhr2025.com

18 July 2025
17:30

Report

Brazil	61–93	Hungary
Scoring by quarter: 19–17, 16–25, 10–26, 16–25
Pts: Nascimento 15; Rebs: Dias 5 Asts: An. Silva, Dias 1		Pts: Sitku 21; Rebs: Telegdy, Tóth 5 Asts: Dombai 7

Grugahalle, Essen
Referees: John Conley Jr. (USA), Hwang Ji-sun (KOR), Martin Van Hoye (BEL)

18 July 2025
20:00

Report

Lithuania	83–101	Japan
Scoring by quarter: 24–20, 13–24, 25–30, 21–27
Pts: Paliulytė 18; Rebs: Grigaliūnaitė 8 Asts: four players of 3 each		Pts: Asahina 16; Rebs: Tateyama, Higuchi 6 Asts: Asahina 6

Ischelandhalle, Hagen
Referees: Alin Faur (ROU), Sun Yimiao (CHN), Diogo Martins (POR)

19 July 2025
14:30

Report

Brazil	63–86	Japan
Scoring by quarter: 16–28, 22–23, 18–15, 7–20
Pts: Nascimento 21; Rebs: Dias 6 Asts: Freitas, Souza 2		Pts: Higuchi 21; Rebs: Okamoto, Owaki 7 Asts: Miura. Higuchi, Owaki 4

Walter-Schädlich-Halle, Duisburg
Referees: Sun Yimiao (CHN), Prem Kumar Kanneboina (IND), Mariajesús Rocío González Chaparro (CHI)

19 July 2025
14:30

Report

Lithuania	51–74	Hungary
Scoring by quarter: 4–17, 17–16, 21–23, 9–18
Pts: Ždanevičiūtė 12; Rebs: Motekaitytė 7 Asts: Matulevičiūtė, Motekaitytė 2		Pts: Dombai 16; Rebs: Tóth 10; Asts: P. Dúl 8

Sporthalle am Hallo, Essen
Referees: Carsten Straube (GER), Nemanja Damjanovic (GER), Alexander Moskovic (GER)

20 July 2025
12:00

Report

Hungary	79–71	Japan
Scoring by quarter: 19–17, 25–11, 21–26, 14–17
Pts: Sitku 17; Rebs: Sitku 9 Asts: P. Dúl 5		Pts: Asahina 19; Rebs: Owaki 7 Asts: Higuchi 7

Ischelandhalle, Hagen
Referees: John Lester Celeste (PHI), Edris Naim (GER), Nemanja Damjanovic (GER)

20 July 2025
14:30

Report

Lithuania	82–64	Brazil
Scoring by quarter: 18–16, 14–12, 23–18, 27–18
Pts: Paliulytė 27; Rebs: Paliulytė 11; Asts: Miknaitė 4		Pts: Nascimento 19; Rebs: B. Silva 6 Asts: At. Silva 3

Ischelandhalle, Hagen
Referees: Karol Tomasz Kowalski (FIN), Tobias Kazda (GER), Hendrik Herter (GER)

=== Group D ===
Pos	Team	Pld	W	L	PF	PA	PD	Pts	
1	China	3	3	0	253	142	+111	6	Qualification for quarterfinals
2	Portugal	3	2	1	232	199	+33	5	Qualification for quarterfinals
3	Romania	3	1	2	176	224	−48	4	Qualification for placing 9-16
4	Chile	3	0	3	145	241	−96	3	Qualification for placing 9-16

Source: rhineruhr2025.com

18 July 2025
12:00

Report

Chile	60–64	Romania
Scoring by quarter: 10–20, 13–19, 19–14, 18–11
Pts: García 14; Rebs: Cabrera, Astudillo 8 Asts: Véliz 1		Pts: Militaru 12; Rebs: Croitoru 13; Asts: Croitoru 3

Ischelandhalle, Hagen
Referees: Haruga Iwai (JPN), Martin Kučírek (CZE), Milita Stalaučinskaitė (LTU)

18 July 2025
14:30

Report

China	88–56	Portugal
Scoring by quarter: 20–23, 26–10, 22–13, 20–10
Pts: Chen Yj 19; Rebs: Tang Zt 9 Asts: Li Qy, Chen Yj 4		Pts: Ramos 14; Rebs: Barreto 6 Asts: Carregosa 3

Ischelandhalle, Hagen
Referees: Einārs Tukišs (LAT), Gustavo Edson Mathias (BRA), Karol Tomasz Kowalski (FIN)

19 July 2025
12:00

Report

China	82–49	Romania
Scoring by quarter: 20–9, 21–14, 15–13, 26–13
Pts: Zhang Zh 18; Rebs: Liu Yt 8 Asts: Tang Zt 4		Pts: Cătinean 12; Rebs: Croitoru 5 Asts: Nan, Kozmán 2

Grugahalle, Essen
Referees: Elias Anttonen (FIN), Tomasz Wit Langowski (POL), Robert Konopacki (GER)

19 July 2025
14:30

Report

Chile	48–94	Portugal
Scoring by quarter: 18–10, 20–32, 7–29, 3–23
Pts: Ljubetic 21; Rebs: Ljubetic 7 Asts: four players of 1 each		Pts: Barreto 22; Rebs: Guerreiro 12; Asts: Carregosa 6

Ischelandhalle, Hagen
Referees: Ewa Matuszewska (POL), Veronika Vávrová (CZE), Hendrik Herter (GER)

20 July 2025
12:00

Report

Portugal	82–63	Romania
Scoring by quarter: 20–14, 31–10, 15–19, 16–20
Pts: Bettencourt 14; Rebs: Guerreiro, Carregosa 7 Asts: Ramos, Carregosa 4		Pts: Nan 9 Rebs: Nan, Ion 8 Asts: Cătinean 4

Sporthalle am Hallo, Essen
Referees: Mariajesús Rocío González Chaparro (CHI), Dalibor Sušteršič (SRB), Michael Oesterle (GER)

20 July 2025
14:30

Report

Chile	37–83	China
Scoring by quarter: 5–27, 11–21, 15–13, 6–22
Pts: Ljubetic 20; Rebs: Cabrera 9 Asts: García 4		Pts: Li Qy, Cao By, Liu Yt 12; Rebs: Li Qy, Zhang Zh 6 Asts: five players of 3 each

Sporthalle am Hallo, Essen
Referees: Milita Stalaučinskaitė (LTU), Imran Ali Baig (IND), Anna Sofie Englisch (GER)

== Playoff brackets ==
=== Placing 1-8 ===
Quarterfinals
22 July
A1 Finland	62
B2 United States	77
22 July
C1 Hungary	77
D2 Portugal	51
22 July
A2 Czech Republic	63
B1 Poland	71
22 July
C2 Japan	70
D1 China	75

Semifinals
23 July
B2 United States	73
C1 Hungary	71
23 July
B1 Poland	67
D1 China	71

Final
25 July
B2 United States	69
D1 China	81
3rd place
25 July
C1 Hungary	70
B1 Poland	50

=== Placing 5-8 ===
5th–8th place semifinals
23 July
A1 Finland	51
D2 Portugal	65
23 July
A2 Czech Republic	77
C2 Japan	84

5th place
25 July
D2 Portugal	47
C2 Japan	71
7th place
25 July
A1 Finland	60
A2 Czech Republic	70

=== Placing 9-16 ===
9th–16th place quarterfinals
22 July
A3 Argentina	62
B4 Chinese Taipei	90
22 July
C3 Lithuania	80
D4 Chile	47
22 July
A4 India	54
B3 Germany	128
22 July
C4 Brazil	86
D3 Romania	65

9–12th place semifinals
23 July
B4 Chinese Taipei	59
C3 Lithuania	71
23 July
B3 Germany	84
C4 Brazil	64

9th place
25 July
C3 Lithuania	63
B3 Germany	79
11th place
25 July
B4 Chinese Taipei	91
C4 Brazil	97

=== Placing 13-16 ===
13th–16th place semifinals
23 July
A3 Argentina	58
D4 Chile	74
23 July
A4 India	58
D3 Romania	109

13th place
25 July
D4 Chile	78
D3 Romania	83
15th place
25 July
A3 Argentina	81
A4 India	65

== Playoff results ==
=== Quarterfinals ===
22 July 2025
20:00

Report

Finland	62–77	United States
Scoring by quarter: 18–20, 9–17, 19–21, 16–19
Pts: Ollilainen 15; Rebs: Sandvik 6 Asts: Kanerva 3		Pts: Bristow 20; Rebs: Gaston 12; Asts: Bristow, Blacklock 4

Grugahalle, Essen
Referees: Carsten Straube (GER), Alexandra-Ioana Stan (ROU), John Lester Celeste (PHI)

22 July 2025
17:30

Report

Hungary	77–51	Portugal
Scoring by quarter: 26–13, 18–14, 19–17, 14–7
Pts: Sitku, P. Dúl 13; Rebs: Sitku 13; Asts: Dombai 5		Pts: Barreto, Guerreiro 13; Rebs: Vieira 8 Asts: Bettencourt, Carregosa 3

Ischelandhalle, Hagen
Referees: Lauren Niemiera (USA), Sergio Kassab (LBN), Mariajesús Rocío González Chaparro (CHI)

22 July 2025
20:00

Report

Czech Republic	63–71	Poland
Scoring by quarter: 11–24, 17–13, 17–21, 18–13
Pts: Malíková 18; Rebs: Malíková, Fučíková 4 Asts: Velichová, E. Žílová 3		Pts: Borkowska 16; Rebs: Mielnicka, Borkowska 6 Asts: Wnorowska 5

Ischelandhalle, Hagen
Referees: Ivan Huck Braner (ARG), Martin Van Hoye (BEL), Milita Stalaučinskaitė (LTU)

22 July 2025
17:30

Report

Japan	70–75	China
Scoring by quarter: 21–17, 16–19, 20–18, 13–21
Pts: Asahina 17; Rebs: Asahina 6 Asts: Higuchi 7		Pts: Tian Yy 20; Rebs: Chen Yj 12; Asts: Chen Yj 5

Grugahalle, Essen
Referees: Veronika Vávrová (CZE), Ewa Matuszewska (POL), Nicolas Zivieri (BRA)

=== Semifinals ===
23 July 2025
20:00

Report

United States	73–71	Hungary
Scoring by quarter: 17–11, 26–23, 12–18, 18–19
Pts: Bristow, Gaston 14; Rebs: Bristow, Gaston 11; Asts: Martin 4		Pts: Sitku 28; Rebs: Sitku, Dombai 8 Asts: Angyal, P. Dúl 4

Grugahalle, Essen
Referees: Einārs Tukišs (LAT), Veronika Vávrová (CZE), Ewa Matuszewska (POL)

23 July 2025
17:30

Report

Poland	67–71 (OT)	China
Scoring by quarter: 13–17, 20–9, 15–19, 14–17, Overtime: 5–9
Scoring by half: 33–26, 29–36 Overtime: 5–9
Pts: Szymkiewicz 13; Rebs: Borkowska 14; Asts: Wnorowska, Wojtala 3		Pts: Chen Yj 24; Rebs: Tang Zt 9 Asts: Chen Yj, Liu Yt 3

Grugahalle, Essen
Referees: Lauren Niemiera (USA), Alexandra-Ioana Stan (ROU), Mona Kienast (GER)

=== Final ===
25 July 2025
20:00

Report

United States	69–81	China
Scoring by quarter: 24–21, 18–21, 16–28, 11–11
Pts: Gaston 21; Rebs: Bristow 10; Asts: Love 3		Pts: Chen Yj 19; Rebs: Tang Zt 7 Asts: Tian Yy 7

Grugahalle, Essen
Referees: Milita Stalaučinskaitė (LTU), Veronika Vávrová (CZE), Ewa Matuszewska (POL)

=== 3rd place ===
25 July 2025
17:30

Report

Hungary	70–50	Poland
Scoring by quarter: 19–14, 18–11, 24–7, 9–18
Pts: Dombai 22; Rebs: P. Dúl 7 Asts: T. Dúl 4		Pts: Kulińska, Borkowska 8 Rebs: Borkowska 8 Asts: Mielnicka 3

Grugahalle, Essen
Referees: Danilo Ariel Molina (ARG), Diogo Martins (POR), Mona Kienast (GER)

=== 5th–8th place semifinals ===
23 July 2025
20:00

Report

Finland	51–65	Portugal
Scoring by quarter: 16–18, 10–21, 16–6, 9–20
Pts: Sandvik 13; Rebs: Syla, Onnela 7 Asts: Kanerva, Onnela 3		Pts: Guerreiro 13; Rebs: Martins, Barreto 7 Asts: Ramos 7

Walter-Schädlich-Halle, Duisburg
Referees: Imran Ali Baig (IND), Alexander Moskovic (GER), Dalibor Sustersic (SRB)

23 July 2025
14:30

Report

Czech Republic	77–84 (2OT)	Japan
Scoring by quarter: 13–21, 17–16, 12–18, 21–8, Overtime: 11–11, 3–10
Scoring by half: 30–37, 33–26 Overtime: 11–11, 3–10
Pts: Fučíková 13; Rebs: Fučíková 11; Asts: Hálová 7		Pts: Owaki 23; Rebs: Owaki 12; Asts: Yamada 5

Grugahalle, Essen
Referees: Sergio Kassab (LBN), Nemanja Damjanovic (GER), Anna Sofie Englisch (GER)

=== 5th place ===
25 July 2025
14:30

Report

Portugal	47–71	Japan
Scoring by quarter: 4–19, 20–22, 13–17, 10–13
Pts: Bettencourt, Ramos 10; Rebs: Guerreiro 7 Asts: Vieira, Guerreiro, Ramos 2		Pts: Asahina 19; Rebs: Asahina 12; Asts: Tateyama, Owaki 2

Grugahalle, Essen
Referees: Lauren Niemiera (USA), Tomasz Wit Langowski (POL), Alexandra-Ioana Stan (ROU)

=== 7th place ===
25 July 2025
12:00

Report

Finland	60–70	Czech Republic
Scoring by quarter: 16–9, 20–11, 11–22, 13–28
Pts: Onnela 12; Rebs: Onnela 9 Asts: Kanerva 4		Pts: Kadlecová 18; Rebs: Fučíková 6 Asts: Malíková 4

Grugahalle, Essen
Referees: Chuang Chih-chun (TPE), John Lester Celeste (PHI), Mariajesus Rocio Gonzalez Chaparro (CHI)

=== 9th–16th place quarterfinals ===
22 July 2025
12:00

Report

Argentina	62–90	Chinese Taipei
Scoring by quarter: 17–20, 16–24, 18–24, 11–22
Pts: Santíni 15; Rebs: Bellosta 9 Asts: Hentschel 2		Pts: Hsiao Yw 25; Rebs: Hsiao Yw 15; Asts: Huang Cc 6

Ischelandhalle, Hagen
Referees: Claudio Andrés Osorio Vargas (CHI), Imran Ali Baig (IND), Anna Sofie Englisch (GER)

22 July 2025
12:00

Report

Lithuania	80–47	Chile
Scoring by quarter: 19–11, 19–12, 19–15, 23–9
Pts: Grigaliūnaitė 27; Rebs: Paliulytė 10; Asts: Sederevičiūtė 5		Pts: Ljubetic 22; Rebs: Ljubetic 7 Asts: García 3

Grugahalle, Essen
Referees: Tijmen Last (NED), Chuang Chih-chun (TPE), Tobias Kazda (GER)

22 July 2025
14:30

Report

India	54–128	Germany
Scoring by quarter: 21–31, 11–30, 8–36, 14–31
Pts: Kunghadkar 14; Rebs: Kunghadkar 6 Asts: Kunghadkar 8		Pts: Brennecke 21; Rebs: Brennecke 12; Asts: Pietsch, Eichmeyer 6

Grugahalle, Essen
Referees: Elias Anttonen (FIN), Sun Yimiao (CHN), Lin Yuan-dian (TPE)

22 July 2025
14:30

Report

Brazil	86–65	Romania
Scoring by quarter: 22–19, 15–16, 19–14, 30–16
Pts: B. Silva 16; Rebs: G. Silva 8 Asts: Nascimento 5		Pts: Nan 18; Rebs: Nan 6 Asts: Cătinean, Militaru 4

Ischelandhalle, Hagen
Referees: Tomasz Wit Langowski (POL), Alexander Moskovic (GER), Hwang Ji-sun (KOR)

=== 9–12th place semifinals ===
23 July 2025
14:30

Report

Chinese Taipei	59–71	Lithuania
Scoring by quarter: 18–20, 16–16, 17–14, 8–21
Pts: Tsai Yl 13; Rebs: Yu Ch 9 Asts: Huang Cy 4		Pts: Paliulytė 16; Rebs: Miknaitė 10; Asts: Paliulytė 3

Walter-Schädlich-Halle, Duisburg
Referees: Hwang Ji-sun (KOR), Mariajesus Rocio Gonzalez Chaparro (CHI), Tobias Kazda (GER)

23 July 2025
17:30

Report

Germany	84–64	Brazil
Scoring by quarter: 12–18, 23–8, 32–16, 17–22
Pts: Wittenberg 15; Rebs: Brennecke 6 Asts: Kröger 4		Pts: B. Silva 20; Rebs: G. Silva 10; Asts: Freitas, Souza 4

Walter-Schädlich-Halle, Duisburg
Referees: Balázs Mészáros (HUN), Prem Kumar Kanneboina (IND), John Lester Celeste (PHI)

=== 9th place ===
25 July 2025
14:30

Report

Lithuania	63–79	Germany
Scoring by quarter: 13–18, 19–19, 9–22, 22–20
Pts: Zdanevičiūtė 18; Rebs: Miknaitė 8 Asts: Matulevičius 5		Pts: Gaba 18; Rebs: Eichmeyer 12; Asts: Eichmeyer 5

Sporthalle am Hallo, Essen
Referees: Balázs Mészáros (HUN), Prem Kumar Kanneboina (IND), Sun Yimiao (CHN)

=== 11th place ===
25 July 2025
12:00

Report

Chinese Taipei	83–78 (OT)	Brazil
Scoring by quarter: 14–17, 20–17, 16–26, 18–8, Overtime: 15–10
Scoring by half: 34–34, 34–34 Overtime: 15–10
Pts: Lin Cj 28; Rebs: Yu Ch 13; Asts: Huang Cc 10		Pts: Nascimento 22; Rebs: Gonçalves, B. Silva, Dias 6 Asts: Souza 6

Sporthalle am Hallo, Essen
Referees: Claudio Andrés Osorio Vargas (CHI), Michael Oesterle (GER), Milutin Jelenic (GER)

=== 13th–16th place semifinals ===
23 July 2025
12:00

Report

Argentina	58–74	Chile
Scoring by quarter: 18–13, 14–20, 16–21, 10–20
Pts: Hentschel 15; Rebs: Hentschel 11; Asts: Bellosta 4		Pts: Ljubetic 30; Rebs: Díaz 11; Asts: García, Valenzuela 4

Walter-Schädlich-Halle, Duisburg
Referees: Elias Anttonen (FIN), Lin Yuan-dian (TPE), Edris Naim (GER)

23 July 2025
12:00

Report

India	58–109	Romania
Scoring by quarter: 14–13, 14–25, 21–43, 9–28
Pts: Behal 22; Rebs: Behal 15; Asts: Kunghadkar, Shetty, Srivastava 2		Pts: Petrof, Croitoru 20; Rebs: Croitoru 11; Asts: Simescu Stoia 6

Grugahalle, Essen
Referees: Sun Yimiao (CHN), Hendrik Herter (GER), Robert Konopacki (GER)

=== 13th place ===
25 July 2025
14:30

Report

Chile	78–83	Romania
Scoring by quarter: 25–15, 21–21, 19–17, 13–30
Pts: Ljubetic 30; Rebs: Valenzuela 9 Asts: García 9		Pts: Petrof 23; Rebs: Nan 10; Asts: Cătinean 4

Walter-Schädlich-Halle, Duisburg
Referees: Sergio Kassab (LBN), Imran Ali Baig (IND), Dalibor Sustersic (SRB)

=== 15th place ===
25 July 2025
12:00

Report

Argentina	81–65	India
Scoring by quarter: 22–21, 26–11, 16–6, 17–27
Pts: Hentschel 26; Rebs: Bellosta 10; Asts: Romagnoli 8		Pts: Philip 21; Rebs: Behal 16; Asts: Kunghadkar 6

Walter-Schädlich-Halle, Duisburg
Referees: Martin Kucirek (CZE), Lin Yuan-dian (TPE), Hwang Ji-sun (KOR)

== Final standings ==
Place	Team	Record
1st place, gold medalist(s)	China	6–0
2nd place, silver medalist(s)	United States	4–2
3rd place, bronze medalist(s)	Hungary	5–1
4	Poland	4–2
5	Japan	4–2
6	Portugal	3–3
7	Czech Republic	3–3
8	Finland	3–3
9	Germany	4–2
10	Lithuania	3–3
11	Chinese Taipei	2–4
12	Brazil	1–5
13	Romania	3–3
14	Chile	1–5
15	Argentina	2–4
16	India	0–6
