= Swimming at the 2025 Summer World University Games – Women's 200 metre butterfly =

Women's 200 metre butterfly at the 2025 Summer World University Games
- Venue: Schwimm- und Sprunghalle im Europasportpark
- Location: Berlin
- Dates: 22 July (heats and semifinals); 23 July (final)
- Competitors: 27 from 22 nations

Medalists
gold medal	Tess Howley	United States
silver medal	Lindsay Looney	United States
bronze medal	Paola Borrelli	Italy

The women's 200 metre butterfly at the 2025 Summer World University Games in Rhine-Ruhr, Germany was held from 22 to 23 July 2025. Tess Howley from the United States won the gold medal, Lindsay Looney from the United States took the silver medal and Paola Borrelli from Italy earned the bronze medal.

== Schedule ==
All times are Central European Time (UTC+1)

Date	Time	Round
22 July	09:56	Heats
22 July	20:53	Semifinals
23 July	19:28	Final

== Records ==
Prior to the competition, the world and Universiade records were as follows.

Category	Swimmer	Record	Date	Place	Event
World record	(China) Liu Zige	2:01.81	21 October 2009	Jinan, China	2009 National Games of China
Universiade record	(Canada) Audrey Lacroix	2:05.83	14 August 2007	Bangkok, Thailand	2007 Summer Universiade

== Results ==
=== Heats ===
All entered athletes competed across multiple seeded heats in the morning session. Swimmers with the top 16 fastest times advanced, regardless of which individual heat they swam.

Rank	Heat	Lane	Swimmer	Nation	Time	Notes
1	4	4	Tess Howley	United States	2:06.75	Q
2	3	4	Lindsay Looney	United States	2:09.36	Q
3	3	3	Ciara Schlosshan	Great Britain	2:10.44	Q
4	4	5	Paola Borrelli	Italy	2:11.19	Q
5	2	4	Yu Liyan	China	2:11.59	Q
6	4	6	Sarah Dumont	Belgium	2:12.43	Q
7	4	3	Julia Pujadas	Spain	2:12.46	Q
8	2	3	Laura Ilyés	Hungary	2:12.48	Q
9	3	6	Ayami Suzuki	Japan	2:13.07	Q
10	3	5	Antonella Crispino	Italy	2:13.10	Q
11	3	7	Deniz Ertan	Turkey	2:13.82	Q
12	4	2	Poppy Stephen	Australia	2:13.95	Q
13	3	2	Hong Jung-hwa	South Korea	2:14.29	Q
14	2	5	Uran Noda	Japan	2:14.39	Q
15	2	2	Applejean Gwinn	Chinese Taipei	2:14.58	Q
16	2	6	Mariana Cunha	Portugal	2:16.04	
17	2	7	Fabienne Pavlik	Austria	2:16.22	Q
18	3	1	Gaia Rasmussen	Switzerland	2:17.48	
19	2	1	Leigh McMorran	South Africa	2:19.54	
20	4	1	Wiktoria Piotrowska	Poland	2:24.56	
21	4	8	Belen Lahoz	Argentina	2:26.56	
22	3	8	Jedidah Ajithjeswanthsingh	India	2:29.49	
23	2	8	Victoria Okumu	Kenya	2:38.98	
24	1	4	Nilabjaa Ghosh	India	2:45.11	
—	4	7	Ieva Maļuka	Latvia	DNS	
—	1	5	Dayanna Barreto	Ecuador	DNS	
—	1	3	Kimberly Uyaguari	Ecuador	DNS	

=== Semifinals ===
The 16 advancing swimmers were split into two semifinal heats of 8 during the evening session. The swimmers recording the top 8 fastest times advanced to the final round.

Rank	Heat	Lane	Swimmer	Nation	Time	Notes
1	2	4	Tess Howley	United States	2:05.20	Q, FR
2	1	4	Lindsay Looney	United States	2:07.98	Q
3	2	5	Ciara Schlosshan	Great Britain	2:09.48	Q
4	2	3	Yu Liyan	China	2:09.56	Q
5	1	5	Paola Borrelli	Italy	2:09.82	Q
6	2	2	Ayami Suzuki	Japan	2:11.11	Q
7	1	6	Laura Ilyés	Hungary	2:11.39	Q
8	1	2	Antonella Crispino	Italy	2:11.74	Q
9	1	3	Sarah Dumont	Belgium	2:11.91	
10	2	6	Julia Pujadas	Spain	2:12.48	
11	1	7	Poppy Stephen	Australia	2:12.95	
12	1	1	Uran Noda	Japan	2:13.08	
13	2	8	Applejean Gwinn	Chinese Taipei	2:15.24	
14	2	1	Hong Jung-hwa	South Korea	2:15.56	
14	2	7	Deniz Ertan	Turkey	2:15.56	
16	1	8	Fabienne Pavlik	Austria	2:16.16	

=== Final ===
The fastest 8 swimmers competed in a single race to determine the gold, silver and bronze medalists.

Rank	Lane	Swimmer	Nation	Time	Notes
1st place, gold medalist(s)	4	Tess Howley	United States	2:05.69	
2nd place, silver medalist(s)	5	Lindsay Looney	United States	2:07.79	
3rd place, bronze medalist(s)	2	Paola Borrelli	Italy	2:08.00	
4	6	Yu Liyan	China	2:08.73	
5	3	Ciara Schlosshan	Great Britain	2:09.35	
6	8	Antonella Crispino	Italy	2:09.89	
7	1	Laura Ilyés	Hungary	2:11.48	
8	7	Ayami Suzuki	Japan	2:11.79	
