= Fencing at the 2025 Summer World University Games – Men's individual foil =

Men's individual foil at the 2025 Summer World University Games
- Venue: Messe Essen
- Location: Essen
- Dates: 19 July
- Competitors: 75 from 26 nations

Medalists
gold medal	Damiano Di Veroli	Italy
silver medal	Jan Nowak	Poland
bronze medal	Choi Min-seo	South Korea
bronze medal	Tommaso Martini	Italy

The men's individual foil at the 2025 Summer World University Games in Rhine-Ruhr, Germany was held 19 July 2025. The gold medal was won by Italian fencer Damiano Di Veroli. He defeated Poland's Jan Nowak in the final match, who took home the silver medal. The bronze medals were shared by Choi Min-seo of South Korea and Tommaso Martini of Italy.

== Pool Results ==
75 fencers were divided into groups (pools) of 6 or 7. Seeding was based on the official FIE world rankings from 14 July 2025. Every fencer played against everyone else in their assigned pool. Bouts in this stage were short, played to 5 touches (or until the 3-minute time limit expired). After all pool matches concluded, an overall ranking was generated based on the ratio of victories and the indicator of touches. The lowest-ranked fencers were eliminated, while the rest advanced to the main bracket.

Qualified for Table of 32
Qualified for Table of 64

=== Pool 1 ===
#	Seed	Athlete	1	2	3	4	5	6	7	V#	M#	Ind.	TG	TR	Diff.	RP
1	1	Giulio Lombardi (ITA)		D_{3}	V_{4}	D_{2}	V_{5}	V_{5}	V_{5}	4	6	0.67	24	17	7	3
2	22	Khaled Hussein (QAT)	V_{5}		V_{5}	V_{5}	V_{5}	V_{5}	V_{5}	6	6	1.00	30	16	14	1
3	45	Jan Nowak (POL)	D_{3}	D_{3}		D_{4}	V_{5}	V_{5}	V_{5}	3	6	0.50	25	20	5	4
4	44	Nils Fabinger (GER)	V_{5}	D_{4}	V_{5}		V_{5}	V_{5}	V_{5}	5	6	0.83	29	16	13	2
5	23	Hsu Sheng-hung (TPE)	D_{2}	D_{1}	D_{3}	D_{3}		V_{5}	V_{5}	2	6	0.33	19	23	-4	5
6	75	Harshil Sharma (IND)	D_{0}	D_{3}	D_{2}	D_{0}	D_{2}		D_{1}	0	6	0.00	8	30	-22	7
7	72	Daniel Mautner (AUS)	D_{2}	D_{2}	D_{1}	D_{2}	D_{1}	V_{5}		1	6	0.17	13	26	-13	6

=== Pool 2 ===
#	Seed	Athlete	1	2	3	4	5	6	7	V#	M#	Ind.	TG	TR	Diff.	RP
1	24	Árpád Fazekas (SVK)		V_{5}	V_{5}	V_{5}	V_{5}	D_{4}	V_{5}	5	6	0.83	29	17	12	2
2	70	Luka Kreiziger (SLO)	D_{0}		D_{1}	D_{0}	D_{1}	D_{1}	D_{0}	0	6	0.00	3	30	-27	7
3	21	Mateusz Kwiatkowski (POL)	D_{3}	V_{5}		V_{5}	V_{5}	D_{2}	D_{4}	3	6	0.50	24	23	1	4
4	46	Yueh Che-hao (TPE)	D_{4}	V_{5}	D_{3}		V_{5}	D_{1}	D_{2}	2	6	0.33	20	21	-1	5
5	66	Axel Elmfeldt (SWE)	D_{1}	V_{5}	D_{4}	D_{1}		D_{1}	D_{3}	1	6	0.17	15	26	-11	6
6	43	Lim Hye-seong (KOR)	V_{5}	V_{5}	V_{5}	V_{5}	V_{5}		D_{3}	5	6	0.83	28	14	14	1
7	2	Tommaso Martini (ITA)	D_{4}	V_{5}	V_{5}	V_{5}	V_{5}	V_{5}		5	6	0.83	29	17	12	2

=== Pool 3 ===
#	Seed	Athlete	1	2	3	4	5	6	7	V#	M#	Ind.	TG	TR	Diff.	RP
1	71	Conrad Lo (USA)		D_{3}	D_{2}	V_{5}	V_{5}	V_{5}	V_{5}	4	6	0.67	25	18	7	3
2	20	Henri Ask (SWE)	V_{5}		V_{5}	V_{5}	V_{5}	V_{5}	D_{3}	5	6	0.83	28	16	12	2
3	3	Chen Chih-chieh (TPE)	V_{5}	D_{4}		V_{5}	V_{5}	V_{5}	V_{5}	5	6	0.83	29	15	14	1
4	47	Eitan Rokhkind (ISR)	D_{2}	D_{2}	D_{2}		V_{5}	V_{5}	D_{0}	2	6	0.33	16	25	-9	6
5	73	Zoltán Sármány (SVK)	D_{1}	D_{1}	D_{0}	D_{1}		D_{2}	D_{4}	0	6	0.00	9	30	-21	7
6	42	Andrii Cherkashyn (UKR)	D_{3}	D_{1}	D_{3}	D_{4}	V_{5}		V_{5}	2	6	0.33	21	25	-4	5
7	25	Alexander Hubner (AUT)	D_{2}	V_{5}	D_{3}	V_{5}	V_{5}	D_{3}		3	6	0.50	23	22	1	4

=== Pool 4 ===
#	Seed	Athlete	1	2	3	4	5	6	7	V#	M#	Ind.	TG	TR	Diff.	RP
1	41	Szymon Pacholczyk (POL)		D_{4}	V_{5}	V_{5}	V_{5}	D_{4}	D_{2}	3	6	0.50	25	21	4	3
2	19	Chris Mak (HKG)	V_{5}		D_{4}	V_{5}	D_{1}	D_{1}	D_{4}	2	6	0.33	20	27	-7	6
3	68	Aditya Jain (USA)	D_{0}	V_{5}		V_{5}	D_{1}	D_{3}	V_{5}	3	6	0.50	19	21	-2	4
4	48	Álvaro Peral (ESP)	D_{3}	D_{3}	D_{1}		D_{0}	D_{3}	V_{5}	1	6	0.17	15	28	-13	7
5	4	Chen Yi-tung (TPE)	D_{3}	V_{5}	V_{5}	V_{5}		V_{5}	D_{3}	4	6	0.67	26	15	11	2
6	64	Choi Min-seo (KOR)	V_{5}	V_{5}	V_{5}	V_{5}	D_{3}		V_{5}	5	6	0.83	28	18	10	1
7	26	Hugo Bosnic (AUS)	V_{5}	V_{5}	D_{1}	D_{3}	V_{5}	D_{2}		3	6	0.50	21	24	-3	5

=== Pool 5 ===
#	Seed	Athlete	1	2	3	4	5	6	7	V#	M#	Ind.	TG	TR	Diff.	RP
1	63	Choi Hye-kjun (KOR)		V_{5}	D_{3}	V_{5}	V_{5}	D_{4}	V_{5}	4	6	0.67	27	19	8	2
2	49	Alexander Wu (USA)	D_{1}		D_{4}	D_{4}	V_{5}	D_{2}	D_{4}	1	6	0.17	20	28	-8	7
3	5	Damiano Di Veroli (ITA)	V_{5}	V_{5}		V_{5}	D_{3}	V_{5}	V_{5}	5	6	0.83	28	21	7	1
4	18	Oscar Geudvert (BEL)	D_{2}	V_{5}	D_{4}		V_{5}	V_{5}	V_{5}	4	6	0.67	26	20	6	3
5	60	Hiroto Sugaya (JPN)	D_{2}	D_{3}	V_{5}	D_{3}		V_{5}	D_{3}	2	6	0.33	21	25	-4	5
6	40	Álmos Bálint (HUN)	V_{5}	V_{5}	D_{2}	D_{1}	D_{2}		D_{3}	2	6	0.33	18	26	-8	6
7	27	Joe Donaghue (GBR)	D_{4}	V_{5}	D_{3}	D_{2}	V_{5}	V_{5}		3	6	0.50	24	25	-1	4

=== Pool 6 ===
#	Seed	Athlete	1	2	3	4	5	6	7	V#	M#	Ind.	TG	TR	Diff.	RP
1	28	Maciej Bem (POL)		D_{3}	D_{2}	V_{5}	V_{5}	D_{4}	V_{5}	3	6	0.50	24	21	3	4
2	6	Armand Spichiger (FRA)	V_{5}		V_{5}	V_{5}	V_{5}	V_{5}	V_{5}	6	6	1.00	30	12	18	1
3	50	Yaroslav Muruhin (UKR)	V_{5}	D_{3}		D_{3}	V_{5}	D_{2}	V_{5}	3	6	0.50	23	24	-1	5
4	61	Dániel Zsigmond (HUN)	D_{4}	D_{0}	V_{5}		D_{1}	D_{1}	D_{2}	1	6	0.17	13	28	-15	7
5	39	Leopold Kuchta (SVK)	D_{2}	D_{2}	D_{4}	V_{5}		V_{5}	V_{5}	3	6	0.50	23	18	5	3
6	17	Ryosuke Fukuda (JPN)	V_{5}	D_{2}	V_{5}	V_{5}	D_{1}		V_{5}	4	6	0.67	23	19	4	2
7	65	Ajaysinh Chudasama (IND)	D_{0}	D_{2}	D_{3}	V_{5}	D_{1}	D_{2}		1	6	0.17	13	27	-14	6

=== Pool 7 ===
#	Seed	Athlete	1	2	3	4	5	6	7	V#	M#	Ind.	TG	TR	Diff.	RP
1	7	Yasutaka Nishiguchi (JPN)		V_{5}	D_{3}	V_{5}	V_{5}	V_{5}	V_{5}	5	6	0.83	28	12	16	1
2	51	Sathvik Shoba Manjunatha (IND)	D_{0}		D_{1}	D_{2}	D_{4}	D_{1}	D_{2}	0	6	0.00	10	30	-20	7
3	62	Spencer Burke (USA)	V_{5}	V_{5}		D_{4}	V_{5}	V_{5}	V_{5}	5	6	0.83	29	16	13	2
4	38	Albert Bagdány (HUN)	D_{4}	V_{5}	V_{5}		V_{5}	V_{5}	D_{2}	4	6	0.67	26	21	5	3
5	74	James Schulz (AUS)	D_{0}	V_{5}	D_{0}	D_{2}		D_{2}	D_{2}	1	6	0.17	11	29	-18	6
6	16	Adrien Helmy-Cocoynacq (FRA)	D_{3}	V_{5}	D_{3}	D_{3}	V_{5}		V_{5}	3	6	0.50	24	22	2	4
7	29	Ievgen Lazarenko (UKR)	D_{0}	V_{5}	D_{4}	V_{5}	V_{5}	D_{4}		3	6	0.50	23	21	2	5

=== Pool 8 ===
#	Seed	Athlete	1	2	3	4	5	6	7	V#	M#	Ind.	TG	TR	Diff.	RP
1	31	Federico Pistorio (ITA)		V_{5}	D_{1}	V_{5}	D_{1}	V_{5}	V_{5}	4	6	0.67	22	17	5	3
2	59	Germán Ferreiro (ESP)	D_{2}		D_{2}	D_{4}	D_{2}	V_{5}	D_{3}	1	6	0.17	18	28	-10	6
3	37	Niklas Diestelkamp (GER)	V_{5}	V_{5}		V_{5}	V_{5}	V_{5}	V_{5}	6	6	1.00	30	13	17	1
4	69	Abhinash Kangabam (IND)	D_{0}	V_{5}	D_{0}		V_{5}	V_{5}	D_{1}	3	6	0.50	16	26	-10	5
5	8	Kruz Schembri (ISV)	V_{5}	V_{5}	D_{4}	D_{3}		V_{5}	V_{5}	4	6	0.67	27	17	10	2
6	52	Teun Jans (NED)	D_{1}	D_{3}	D_{2}	D_{4}	D_{3}		D_{4}	0	6	0.00	17	30	-13	7
7	13	Philippe Wakim (LBN)	D_{4}	V_{5}	D_{4}	V_{5}	D_{1}	V_{5}		3	6	0.50	24	23	1	4

=== Pool 9 ===
#	Seed	Athlete	1	2	3	4	5	6	7	V#	M#	Ind.	TG	TR	Diff.	RP
1	14	Abdalla Khalifa (QAT)		V_{5}	V_{5}	D_{4}	V_{5}	D_{2}	V_{5}	4	6	0.67	26	14	12	2
2	9	An Hyeon-bhin (KOR)	D_{3}		D_{2}	V_{5}	V_{5}	V_{5}	D_{3}	3	6	0.50	23	21	2	4
3	53	Zoltán Gergely (HUN)	D_{0}	V_{5}		V_{5}	V_{5}	D_{3}	V_{5}	4	6	0.67	23	14	9	3
4	30	Hoi Man Kit (MAC)	V_{5}	D_{2}	D_{2}		V_{5}	D_{1}	D_{4}	2	6	0.33	19	28	-9	6
5	67	Ivan Ilyashev (UKR)	D_{0}	D_{1}	D_{0}	D_{4}		D_{2}	D_{3}	0	6	0.00	10	30	-20	7
6	36	Moritz Renner (GER)	V_{5}	D_{3}	V_{4}	V_{5}	V_{5}		V_{5}	5	6	0.83	27	13	14	1
7	58	Julian Haasbeek (NED)	D_{1}	V_{5}	D_{1}	V_{5}	V_{5}	D_{0}		3	6	0.50	17	25	-8	5

=== Pool 10 ===
#	Seed	Athlete	1	2	3	4	5	6	V#	M#	Ind.	TG	TR	Diff.	RP
1	32	Shoren Hayashi (JPN)		V_{5}	V_{5}	V_{5}	D_{2}	D_{4}	3	5	0.60	21	16	5	3
2	35	Dario Stenbeck-Schiavo (GBR)	D_{2}		V_{5}	V_{5}	D_{4}	V_{5}	3	5	0.60	21	18	3	4
3	55	Alexander Zoons (NED)	D_{1}	D_{3}		D_{0}	D_{4}	V_{5}	1	5	0.20	13	20	-7	5
4	10	Mathieu Nijs (BEL)	D_{3}	D_{4}	V_{5}		V_{5}	V_{5}	3	5	0.60	22	16	6	2
5	57	Adam Eliaz (ISR)	V_{5}	V_{5}	V_{5}	D_{3}		V_{5}	4	5	0.80	23	16	7	1
6	15	Wu Chong Him (MAC)	V_{5}	D_{1}	D_{0}	D_{3}	D_{1}		1	5	0.20	10	24	-14	6

=== Pool 11 ===
#	Seed	Athlete	1	2	3	4	5	6	V#	M#	Ind.	TG	TR	Diff.	RP
1	11	Eliot Chagnon (FRA)		V_{5}	V_{5}	V_{5}	V_{5}	V_{5}	5	5	1.00	25	13	12	1
2	34	Jan Fritsche (GER)	D_{4}		V_{5}	D_{4}	V_{5}	V_{5}	3	5	0.60	23	16	7	2
3	33	Arnau Gumà (ESP)	D_{4}	D_{2}		V_{5}	V_{5}	D_{1}	2	5	0.40	17	18	-1	4
4	12	Aaron Lee (HKG)	D_{2}	V_{5}	D_{1}		V_{4}	V_{5}	3	5	0.60	17	19	-2	3
5	54	Alexander Culkin (GBR)	D_{2}	D_{1}	D_{2}	D_{3}		V_{5}	1	5	0.20	13	22	-9	6
6	56	Crystal Traitel (ISR)	D_{1}	D_{3}	V_{5}	D_{2}	D_{3}		1	5	0.20	14	21	-7	5

== Results bracket ==
Qualified fencers were placed into a standard knockout bracket based on their pool performance ranking. Bouts in the knockout phase were played to 15 touches. The match was divided into 3 rounds of 3 minutes each, with a 1-minute rest period between rounds. If time expired before 15 touches were scored, the fencer with the higher score won. A single loss at any stage meant immediate elimination from the individual competition. The two losers of the semifinal matches did not compete against each other. Both automatically received bronze medals.

Table of 64
33	J Nowak (POL)	15
32	A Lee (HKG)	11
17	A Khalifa (QAT)	5
48	A Kangabam (IND)	15
49	A Gumà (ESP)	8
16	A Eliaz (ISR)	15
40T	P Wakim (LBN)	3
24	O Geudvert (BEL)	15
25	A Bagdány (HUN)	11
40T	M Kwiatkowski (POL)	15
37	A Helmy-Cocoynacq (FRA)	15
28	J Fritsche (GER)	9
21	Choi Hk (KOR)	10
44	Y Muruhin (UKR)	15
53	Hsu Sh (TPE)	9
11T	T Martini (ITA)	15
13	H Ask (SWE)	13
51T	H Sugaya (JPN)	15
45	A Jain (USA)	13
20	Z Gergely (HUN)	15
29	M Nijs (BEL)	15
36	M Bem (POL)	13
35	S Pacholczyk (POL)	4
30	S Hayashi (JPN)	15
19	K Schembri (ISV)	15
46	H Bosnic (AUS)	7
51T	A Cherkashyn (UKR)	8
14	Choi Ms (KOR)	15
11T	Á Fazekas (SVK)	12
54	C Mak (HKG)	15
43	J Donaghue (GBR)	15
22	C Lo (USA)	13
27	R Fukuda (JPN)	14
38T	I Lazarenko (UKR)	15
38T	An Hb (KOR)	13
26	F Pistorio (ITA)	15
23	G Lombardi (ITA)	15
42	A Hubner (AUT)	5
55	Á Bálint (HUN)	15
9T	S Burke (USA)	9
15	D Di Veroli (ITA)	15
50	Yueh Ch (TPE)	6
47	J Haasbeek (NED)	6
18	Chen Yt (TPE)	15
31	D Stenbeck-Schiavo (GBR)	15
34	L Kuchta (SVK)	11

Table of 32
1	A Spichiger (FRA)	14
33	J Nowak (POL)	15
25	A Kangabam (IND)	15
16	A Eliaz (ISR)	9
9T	N Fabinger (GER)	6
24	O Geudvert (BEL)	15
40T	M Kwiatkowski (POL)	8
8	M Renner (GER)	15
5	Y Nishiguchi (JPN)	6
37	A Helmy-Cocoynacq (FRA)	15
44	Y Muruhin (UKR)	14
11T	T Martini (ITA)	15
51T	H Sugaya (JPN)	15
20	Z Gergely (HUN)	6
29	M Nijs (BEL)	12
4	E Chagnon (FRA)	15
3	K Hussein (QAT)	7
30	S Hayashi (JPN)	15
19	K Schembri (ISV)	8
14	Choi Ms (KOR)	15
54	C Mak (HKG)	15
43	J Donaghue (GBR)	12
38T	I Lazarenko (UKR)	12
6	Chen Cc (TPE)	15
7	Lim Hs (KOR)	12
26	F Pistorio (ITA)	15
23	G Lombardi (ITA)	15
55	Á Bálint (HUN)	9
15	D Di Veroli (ITA)	15
18	Chen Yt (TPE)	10
31	D Stenbeck-Schiavo (GBR)	9
2	N Diestelkamp (GER)	15

Table of 16
33	J Nowak (POL)	15
25	A Kangabam (IND)	8
24	O Geudvert (BEL)	15
8	M Renner (GER)	13
37	A Helmy-Cocoynacq (FRA)	8
11T	T Martini (ITA)	15
51T	H Sugaya (JPN)	15
4	E Chagnon (FRA)	14
30	S Hayashi (JPN)	10
14	Choi Ms (KOR)	15
54	C Mak (HKG)	11
6	Chen Cc (TPE)	15
26	F Pistorio (ITA)	3
23	G Lombardi (ITA)	15
15	D Di Veroli (ITA)	15
2	N Diestelkamp (GER)	9

Quarterfinals
33	J Nowak (POL)	15
24	O Geudvert (BEL)	9
11T	T Martini (ITA)	15
51T	H Sugaya (JPN)	12
14	Choi Ms (KOR)	15
6	Chen Cc (TPE)	13
23	G Lombardi (ITA)	14
15	D Di Veroli (ITA)	15

Semifinals
33	J Nowak (POL)	15
11T	T Martini (ITA)	13
14	Choi Ms (KOR)	5
15	D Di Veroli (ITA)	15

Final
33	J Nowak (POL)	12
15	D Di Veroli (ITA)	15
