= Fencing at the 2025 Summer World University Games – Men's team foil =

Men's team foil at the 2025 Summer World University Games
- Venue: Messe Essen
- Location: Essen
- Dates: 22 July
- Nations: 17

Medalists
gold medal	Damiano Di Veroli; Giulio Lombardi; Tommaso Martini; Federico Pistorio	Italy
silver medal	Maciej Bem; Mateusz Kwiatkowski; Jan Nowak; Szymon Pacholczyk	Poland
bronze medal	Ryosuke Fukuda; Shoren Hayashi; Yasutaka Nishiguchi; Hiroto Sugaya	Japan

The men's team foil at the 2025 Summer World University Games in Rhine-Ruhr, Germany was held 22 July 2025. Italy won the gold medal. They defeated Poland by a dominant margin of 25 points in the final match, while Japan secured the bronze medal.

== Results bracket ==
The first team to reach 45 points won the match. If time ran out, the team with the higher score won. Each of the 9 bouts had a target score cap in multiples of 5 (e.g., Bout 1 capped at 5 points, Bout 2 at 10 points, up to Bout 9 at 45 points). Each individual bout lasted for a maximum of 3 minutes. If the time expired before reaching the cap, the next pair started fencing from the current cumulative score.Losing teams were immediately eliminated from the gold medal contention. Teams eliminated in early rounds fenced placement matches to determine final world rankings. The two teams that lost in the semifinals faced each other to win the bronze medal.

Table of 32
17	Macau	45
16	Australia	36

Table of 16
1	Italy	45
17	Macau	25
9	Ukraine	37
8	Hungary	44
5	South Korea	45
12	Israel	27
13	India	20
4	France	45
3	Germany	44
14	Netherlands	28
11	United States	43
6	Poland	45
7	Chinese Taipei	45
10	Great Britain	33
15	Spain	24
2	Japan	45

Quarterfinals
1	Italy	45
8	Hungary	25
5	South Korea	45
4	France	40
3	Germany	39
6	Poland	45
7	Chinese Taipei	44
2	Japan	45

Semifinals
1	Italy	45
5	South Korea	28
6	Poland	45
2	Japan	42

Final
1	Italy	45
6	Poland	20
Third place
5	South Korea	36
2	Japan	45
