= Belgium at the 2025 Summer World University Games =

- Flag of Belgium
- IOC code: BEL
- National federation: Fédération Sportive Universitaire Belge

in Rhine-Ruhr, Germany 16 July 2025 – 27 July 2025
- Competitors: 67 in 10 sports
- Medals Ranked 32nd: Gold 1 Silver 1 Bronze 2 Total 4

Summer World University Games appearances
- 1959; 1961; 1963; 1965; 1967; 1970; 1973; 1975; 1977; 1979; 1981; 1983; 1985; 1987; 1989; 1991; 1993; 1995; 1997; 1999; 2001; 2003; 2005; 2007; 2009; 2011; 2013; 2015; 2017; 2019; 2021; 2025; 2027

Belgium competed at the 2025 Summer World University Games in Rhine-Ruhr, Germany held from 16 to 27 July 2025. Belgium was represented by 67 athletes and took thirty-second place in the medal table with four medals.

== Medal summary ==
=== Medal by sports ===
Rank	Sports	Gold	Silver	Bronze	Total
1	Athletics	1	0	0	1
2	Taekwondo	0	1	0	1
3	Artistic gymnastics	0	0	1	1
3	Tennis	0	0	1	1
Totals (4 entries)		1	1	2	4

Source: rhineruhr2025.com

=== Medalists ===
Medal	Name	Sport	Event	Date
Gold	Elien Vekemans	Athletics	Women's pole vault	25 July
Silver	Sarah Chaâri	Taekwondo	Women -73kg	22 July
Bronze	Jana Otzipka	Tennis	Women's singles	24 July
Bronze	Jade Vansteenkiste	Artistic gymnastics	Women's floor exercise	26 July
