= Czech Republic at the 2025 Summer World University Games =

- Flag of Czech Republic
- IOC code: CZE
- National federation: Czech University Sports Association

in Rhine-Ruhr, Germany 16 July 2025 – 27 July 2025
- Competitors: 131 in 14 sports
- Medals Ranked 18th: Gold 3 Silver 2 Bronze 6 Total 11

Summer World University Games appearances
- 1993; 1995; 1997; 1999; 2001; 2003; 2005; 2007; 2009; 2011; 2013; 2015; 2017; 2019; 2021; 2025; 2027

Czech Republic competed at the 2025 Summer World University Games in Rhine-Ruhr, Germany held from 16 to 27 July 2025. Czech Republic was represented by 131 athletes and took eighteenth place in the medal table with 11 medals.

== Medal summary ==
=== Medal by sports ===
Rank	Sports	Gold	Silver	Bronze	Total
1	Athletics	1	1	0	2
2	Rowing	1	0	1	2
3	Swimming	1	0	0	1
4	Taekwondo	0	1	0	1
5	Judo	0	0	3	3
6	3x3 basketball	0	0	1	1
6	Tennis	0	0	1	1
Totals (7 entries)		3	2	6	11

Source: rhineruhr2025.com

=== Medalists ===
Medal	Name	Sport	Event	Date
Gold	Daryna Nabojčenko	Swimming	Women's 50m butterfly	18 July
Gold	Barbora Malíková	Athletics	Women's 400m	23 July
Gold	Anna Šantrůčková	Rowing	Women's single sculls	27 July
Silver	Petra Štolbová	Taekwondo	Women -62kg	21 July
Silver	Linda Suchá	Athletics	Women's triple jump	27 July
Bronze	Matěj Rychtecký; Štěpán Borovka; Adam Růžička; Dominik Žák	3x3 basketball	Men	20 July
Bronze	Tereza Bodnárová	Judo	Women -52 kg	23 July
Bronze	Renata Zachová	Judo	Women -63 kg	24 July
Bronze	Petr Mladý	Judo	Men -81 kg	24 July
Bronze	Karolína Kubáňová; Jan Jermář	Tennis	Mixed doubles	24 July
Bronze	Radim Hönig; Kryštof Blaha; Jan Lasota; Martin Pfeifer	Rowing	Men's four	27 July
