= Finland at the 2025 Summer World University Games =

- Flag of Finland
- IOC code: FIN
- National federation: Finnish Student Sports Federation

in Rhine-Ruhr, Germany 16 July 2025 – 27 July 2025
- Flag bearers: Venla Ahti (tennis); Akseli Heinämaa (fencing)
- Medals Ranked 27th: Gold 2 Silver 1 Bronze 3 Total 6

Summer World University Games appearances
- 1959; 1961; 1963; 1965; 1967; 1970; 1973; 1975; 1977; 1979; 1981; 1983; 1985; 1987; 1989; 1991; 1993; 1995; 1997; 1999; 2001; 2003; 2005; 2007; 2009; 2011; 2013; 2015; 2017; 2019; 2021; 2025; 2027

Finland competed at the 2025 Summer World University Games in Rhine-Ruhr, Germany held from 16 to 27 July 2025. Finland was represented by 75 athletes and took twenty-seventh place in the medal table with 6 medals. Venla Ahti (tennis) and Akseli Heinämaa (fencing) was a flag bearers at the opening ceremony.

== Medal summary ==
=== Medal by sports ===
Rank	Sports	Gold	Silver	Bronze	Total
1	Athletics	2	1	2	5
2	Judo	0	0	1	1
Totals (2 entries)		2	1	3	6

Source: rhineruhr2025.com

=== Medalists ===
Medal	Name	Sport	Event	Date
Gold	Saara Keskitalo	Athletics	Women's 100m hurdles	25 July
Gold	Ilona Mononen	Athletics	Women's 3000m steeplechase	27 July
Silver	Aleksi Savolainen	Athletics	Men's decathlon	26 July
Bronze	Topias Laine	Athletics	Men's javelin throw	25 July
Bronze	Emma Krapu	Judo	Women -78 kg	25 July
Bronze	Sara Killinen	Athletics	Women's hammer throw	27 July
