= Table tennis at the 2025 Summer Universiade – Men's doubles =

Men's doubles at the 2025 Summer World University Games
- Venue: Messe Essen
- Location: Essen
- Dates: 21―23 July
- Teams: 62

Medalists
gold medal	Baldwin Chan; Yiu Kwan To	Hong Kong
silver medal	Shunsuke Okano; Yuma Tanigaki	Japan
bronze medal	Cho Dae-seong; Yun Chang-min	South Korea
bronze medal	Eduard Ionescu; Darius Movileanu	Romania

The men's doubles at the 2025 Summer World University Games in Rhine-Ruhr, Germany was held from 21 to 23 July 2025. Baldwin Chan and Yiu Kwan To from Hong Kong won the gold medal. Shunsuke Okano and Yuma Tanigaki from Japan earned the silver medal. The two bronze medals were awarded to Cho Dae-seong and Yun Chang-min from South Korea and Eduard Ionescu and Darius Movileanu from Romania.

== Schedule ==
All times are Central European Time (UTC+1)

Date	Round
21 July	Round of 64
22 July	Round of 32
22 July	Round of 16
23 July	Quarterfinals
23 July	Semifinals
23 July	Final

== Knockout stage ==
The tournament utilized a single-elimination system from the very first round. Unlike the singles events, there was no group stage or round-robin play. Both pairs that lost in the semifinal round automatically received bronze medals. Each individual game was played to 11 points. A pair had to win by a margin of at least two clear points to secure a game. Matches across the tournament were played using a best-of-seven games (sets) format. The first pair to win 4 games won the match and advanced to the next round.

=== Section 1 ===
Round of 64
M Khan (PAK); S Shah (PAK)	3	2	11
D Hőgye (HUN); M Ócsai (HUN)	11	11	13
A Sanders (NED); D Sanders (NED)	11	11	11
A Oruzjada (AZE); N Samadzade (AZE)	5	4	4
E Jiménez (ECU); E Molina (ECU)	3	4	6
B Moullet (SUI); M Scharrer (SUI)	11	11	11
S Naresh (USA); V Sheth (USA)	11	11	11
A Faulkner (IRL); J Sheard (IRL)	4	3	4
R Chen (AUS); R Myrteza (AUS)	4	6	9
L Llantén (CHI); C Lonconado (CHI)	11	11	11
U Dursun (TUR); T Yılmaz (TUR)	11	11	11
T Moldaliev (KGZ); B Osmonov (KGZ)	2	6	9
K Guo (CAN); T Yeung (CAN)	11	4	5
K Tokuda (JPN); J Yokotani (JPN)	13	11	11

Round of 32
B Chan (HKG); Yiu KT (HKG)	11	11	11
D Hőgye (HUN); M Ócsai (HUN)	5	7	2
A Sanders (NED); D Sanders (NED)	6	4	3
B Moullet (SUI); M Scharrer (SUI)	11	11	11
S Naresh (USA); V Sheth (USA)	11	11	11
L Llantén (CHI); C Lonconado (CHI)	7	2	2
U Dursun (TUR); T Yılmaz (TUR)	10	6	1
K Tokuda (JPN); J Yokotani (JPN)	12	11	11

Round of 16
B Chan (HKG); Yiu KT (HKG)	11	11	11
B Moullet (SUI); M Scharrer (SUI)	8	9	8
S Naresh (USA); V Sheth (USA)	6	10	11	9
K Tokuda (JPN); J Yokotani (JPN)	11	12	8	11

=== Section 2 ===
Round of 64
Cho Ds (KOR); Yun Cm (KOR)	11	11	11
C Wadhwa (IND); H Singh (IND)	5	6	4
A Caballes (PHI); R Misa (PHI)	7	10	6
J Tan (SGP); Yang ZY (SGP)	11	12	11
G Dahal (NEP); R Joshi (NEP)	3	2	7
M Grebnev (AIN); V Sidorenko (AIN)	11	11	11
M Chintugs (MGL); M Munkh-ochir (MGL)	4	3	2
Chang Pc (TPE); Feng Yh (TPE)	11	11	11
A Istrate (ROU); D Toma (ROU)	w/o
W Al-Gallal (LBA); S Ahmed (LBA)
He CF (MAC); He Cz (MAC)	11	11	14
M Al-Qassab (KSA); S Al-Suwailem (KSA)	3	7	12
C González (COL); J Uribe (COL)	5	6	12	9
M Danzer (GER); T Köchling (GER)	11	11	10	11
A Grela (POL); S Kolasa (POL)	11	11	9	11
Ao Hl (CHN); Zeng Bx (CHN)	9	9	11	6

Round of 32
Cho Ds (KOR); Yun Cm (KOR)	11	11	6	11
J Tan (SGP); Yang ZY (SGP)	8	8	11	8
M Grebnev (AIN); V Sidorenko (AIN)	4	11	11	8	8
Chang Pc (TPE); Feng Yh (TPE)	11	4	8	11	11
A Istrate (ROU); D Toma (ROU)	11	8	11	11
He CF (MAC); He Cz (MAC)	9	11	2	8
M Danzer (GER); T Köchling (GER)	9	7	11	8
A Grela (POL); S Kolasa (POL)	11	11	9	11

Round of 16
Cho Ds (KOR); Yun Cm (KOR)	9	8	11	11	11
Chang Pc (TPE); Feng Yh (TPE)	11	11	3	9	9
A Istrate (ROU); D Toma (ROU)	11	8	11	19
A Grela (POL); S Kolasa (POL)	7	11	9	17

=== Section 3 ===
Round of 64
V Picard (FRA); B Rembert (FRA)	11	11	11
N Araya (CHI); P Luengo (CHI)	2	4	5
A Murad (IND); D Vaghela (IND)	13	14	11
M Al-Shahi (OMA); B Al-Jassasi (OMA)	11	12	8
N González (COL); C Montealegre (COL)	7	10	8
T Al-Mutairi (KSA); K Al-Shareif (KSA)	11	12	11
Shih WH (HKG); Wan PT (HKG)	11	7	5
Chen Js (CHN); Sun Z (CHN)	13	11	11
A Abdulwahhab (QAT); Y Aly (QAT)	9	9	4
E Huzsvár (HUN); D Molnár (HUN)	11	11	11
M Munkh-ochir (MGL); T Myandal (MGL)	8	8	7
D Comeliau (BEL); N Degros (BEL)	11	11	11
V Hendahewa (SRI); H Warusawithana (SRI)	5	8	11	11	11
Chan CI (MAC); Vong IK (MAC)	11	11	8	9	8
S Iskandarov (UZB); R Rakhmonov (UZB)	5	4	5
E Ionescu (ROU); D Movileanu (ROU)	11	11	11

Round of 32
V Picard (FRA); B Rembert (FRA)	11	11	11
A Murad (IND); D Vaghela (IND)	3	0	6
T Al-Mutairi (KSA); K Al-Shareif (KSA)	6	11	1	6
Chen Js (CHN); Sun Z (CHN)	11	7	11	11
E Huzsvár (HUN); D Molnár (HUN)	10	6	11	11	8
D Comeliau (BEL); N Degros (BEL)	12	11	7	5	11
V Hendahewa (SRI); H Warusawithana (SRI)	3	8	7
E Ionescu (ROU); D Movileanu (ROU)	11	11	11

Round of 16
V Picard (FRA); B Rembert (FRA)	11	11	11
Chen Js (CHN); Sun Z (CHN)	7	9	8
D Comeliau (BEL); N Degros (BEL)	4	5	11	6
E Ionescu (ROU); D Movileanu (ROU)	11	11	9	11

=== Section 4 ===
Round of 64
J Chua (SGP); D Koh (SGP)	11	12	11
D Michna (POL); J Zandecki (POL)	9	10	7
G Gomes (POR); J Magalhães (POR)	11	11	11
R Wu (USA); K Zarehbin (USA)	4	7	6
S Win (AUS); A Choi (AUS)	6	8	11	11	11
A Ioannides (CYP); C Savva (CYP)	11	11	4	3	8
K Fadeev (GER); B Oehme (GER)	11	6	11	11
J Goldir (SVK); J Zelinka (SVK)	9	11	9	5
S Okano (JPN); Y Tanigaki (JPN)	8	11	11	11
N Thanmathikom (THA); P Tungbovornphichet (THA)	11	3	9	7
C Muma (ZAM); J Tembo (ZAM)
C Kirby (IRL); B Watson (IRL)	w/o
Kang Yb (KOR); Lee Dh (KOR)	11	11	11
F Zur Muhlen (NED); L Hulshof (NED)	7	9	7

Round of 32
J Chua (SGP); D Koh (SGP)	11	7	11	9	11
G Gomes (POR); J Magalhães (POR)	6	11	5	11	7
S Win (AUS); A Choi (AUS)	7	0	4
K Fadeev (GER); B Oehme (GER)	11	11	11
S Okano (JPN); Y Tanigaki (JPN)	11	11	11
C Kirby (IRL); B Watson (IRL)	4	4	5
Kang Yb (KOR); Lee Dh (KOR)	7	7	3
Huang Yc (TPE); Kao Cj (TPE)	11	11	11

Round of 16
J Chua (SGP); D Koh (SGP)	11	11	13
K Fadeev (GER); B Oehme (GER)	6	7	11
S Okano (JPN); Y Tanigaki (JPN)	11	11	7	5	11
Huang Yc (TPE); Kao Cj (TPE)	9	7	11	11	4

=== Finals ===
Quarterfinals
B Chan (HKG); Yiu KT (HKG)	11	11	4	11	11
K Tokuda (JPN); J Yokotani (JPN)	6	9	11	5	7
Cho Ds (KOR); Yun Cm (KOR)	11	11	11	11	11
A Istrate (ROU); D Toma (ROU)	3	9	7	13	4
V Picard (FRA); B Rembert (FRA)	11	11	4	10	9	10
E Ionescu (ROU); D Movileanu (ROU)	7	8	11	12	11	12
J Chua (SGP); D Koh (SGP)	11	4	6	9	11
S Okano (JPN); Y Tanigaki (JPN)	7	11	11	11	13

Semifinals
B Chan (HKG); Yiu KT (HKG)	11	11	11	11
Cho Ds (KOR); Yun Cm (KOR)	6	7	8	6
E Ionescu (ROU); D Movileanu (ROU)	5	5	11	5	7
S Okano (JPN); Y Tanigaki (JPN)	11	11	9	11	11

Final
B Chan (HKG); Yiu KT (HKG)	11	11	11	8	11
S Okano (JPN); Y Tanigaki (JPN)	6	4	5	11	3
