= Table tennis at the 2025 Summer Universiade – Mixed doubles =

Mixed doubles at the 2025 Summer World University Games
- Venue: Messe Essen
- Location: Essen
- Dates: 19―22 July
- Teams: 66

Medalists
gold medal	Shunsuke Okano; Kyoka Idesawa	Japan
silver medal	Zeng Beixun; Han Feier	China
bronze medal	Baldwin Chan; Wong Hoi Tung	Hong Kong
bronze medal	Chen Junsong; Wang Xiaotong	China

The mixed doubles at the 2025 Summer World University Games in Rhine-Ruhr, Germany was held from 19 to 22 July 2025. Shunsuke Okano and Kyoka Idesawa from Japan won the gold medal. Zeng Beixun and Han Feier from China earned the silver medal. The two bronze medals were awarded to Baldwin Chan and Wong Hoi Tung from Hong Kong and Chen Junsong and Wang Xiaotong from China.

== Schedule ==
All times are Central European Time (UTC+1)

Date	Round
19 July	Round of 128
19 July	Round of 64
21 July	Round of 32
21 July	Round of 16
21 July	Quarterfinals
22 July	Semifinals
22 July	Final

== Knockout stage ==
The tournament utilized a single-elimination system from the very first round. Unlike the singles events, there was no group stage or round-robin play. Both pairs that lost in the semifinal round automatically received bronze medals. Each individual game was played to 11 points. A pair had to win by a margin of at least two clear points to secure a game. Matches across the tournament were played using a best-of-seven games (sets) format. The first pair to win 4 games won the match and advanced to the next round.

=== Section 1 ===
Round of 128

Round of 64
Yiu KT (HKG); Ng WL (HKG)	8	13	11	7	7
S Okano (JPN); K Idesawa (JPN)	11	11	8	11	11
Kao Cj (TPE); Chien Tc (TPE)	11	11	11
C Lonconado (CHI); C Infante (CHI)	1	2	1
D Sanders (NED); D Jorgseska (NED)	11	11	11
A Choi (AUS); J Budiarto (AUS)	5	8	5
G Gomes (POR); I Matos (POR)	11	6	9	13	7
S Kolasa (POL); K Węgrzyn (POL)	9	11	11	11	11

Round of 32
S Okano (JPN); K Idesawa (JPN)	15	9	11	11
C Kao (TPE); T Chien (TPE)	13	11	7	4
D Sanders (NED); D Jorgseska (NED)	1	8	7
S Kolasa (POL); K Węgrzyn (POL)	11	11	11

Round of 16
S Okano (JPN); K Idesawa (JPN)	13	13	7	11
S Kolasa (POL); K Węgrzyn (POL)	11	11	11	7

=== Section 2 ===
Round of 128

Round of 64
N Thanmathikom (THA); W Tayapitak (THA)	11	11	11
A Murad (IND); P Vartikar (IND)	6	8	7
H Warusawithana (SRI); T Rodrigo (SRI)	11	8	9	12	8
R Rakhmonov (UZB); M Norkulova (UZB)	9	11	11	10	11
J Goldír (SVK); A Illášová (SVK)	13	8	4	11	10
D Molnár (HUN); H Dari (HUN)	11	11	11	4	12
E Molina (ECU); D Espinales (ECU)	4	8	8
T Yılmaz (TUR); E Haraç (TUR)	11	11	11

Round of 32
N Thanmathikom (THA); W Tayapitak (THA)	11	11	11
R Rakhmonov (UZB); M Norkulova (UZB)	8	7	7
D Molnár (HUN); H Dari (HUN)	9	11	7	3
T Yılmaz (TUR); E Haraç (TUR)	11	9	11	11

Round of 16
N Thanmathikom (THA); W Tayapitak (THA)	12	11	6	11
T Yılmaz (TUR); E Haraç (TUR)	10	8	11	4

=== Section 3 ===
Round of 128
A Orujzada (AZE); K Abilzade (AZE)	11	11	9	9
G Dahal (NEP); S Suwal (NEP)	8	13	11	11

Round of 64
D Movileanu (ROU); E Zaharia (ROU)	w/o
R Misa (PHI); K Alicaya (PHI)
K Guo (CAN); I Liao (CAN)	2	3	5
M Grebnev (AIN); M Tailakova (AIN)	11	11	11
B Moullet (SUI); L Maurer (SUI)	3	11	11	11
G Dahal (NEP); S Suwal (NEP)	11	6	7	5
S Naresh (USA); A Tan (USA)	7	11	11	11
B Oehme (GER); F Schreiner (GER)	11	8	5	5

Round of 32
D Movileanu (ROU); E Zaharia (ROU)	9	11	8	14
M Grebnev (AIN); M Tailakova (AIN)	11	7	11	16
B Moullet (SUI); L Maurer (SUI)	12	11	6	9	11
S Naresh (USA); A Tan (USA)	10	9	11	11	7

Round of 16
M Grebnev (AIN); M Tailakova (AIN)	11	11	11
B Moullet (SUI); L Maurer (SUI)	5	6	9

=== Section 4 ===
Round of 128

Round of 64
Cho Ds (KOR); Lee De (KOR)	11	11	11
M Munkh-Ochir (MGL); B Uvgunburged (MGL)	3	6	3
B Rembert (FRA); C Lutz (FRA)	w/o
Chan CI (MAC); Cheung PM (MAC)
C González (COL); A Álzate (COL)	11	11	11
J Tembo (ZAM); S Nkhuwah (ZAM)	1	2	6
J Chua (SGP); J Cheng (SGP)	5	4	8
Chen Js (CHN); Wang Xt (CHN)	11	11	11

Round of 32
Cho Ds (KOR); Lee De (KOR)	12	8	12	11	6
B Rembert (FRA); C Lutz (FRA)	10	11	14	9	11
C González (COL); A Álzate (COL)	7	2	4
Chen Js (CHN); Wang Xt (CHN)	11	11	11

Round of 16
B Rembert (FRA); C Lutz (FRA)	11	11	6	4	4
Chen Js (CHN); Wang Xt (CHN)	7	7	11	11	11

=== Section 5 ===
Round of 128

Round of 64
B Chan (HKG); Wong HT (HKG)	11	11	11
E Walker (AUS); S Win (AUS)	7	2	3
M Danzer (GER); S Klee (GER)	11	11	5	11	11
A Abdulwahhab (QAT); M Ali (QAT)	2	13	11	6	7
A Caballes (PHI); A Salar (PHI)
N Araya (CHI); C Muñoz (CHI)	w/o
V Sheth (USA); E Tan (USA)	12	9	12	11
L Hulshof (NED); S Men (NED)	10	11	10	7

Round of 32
B Chan (HKG); Wong HT (HKG)	11	11	11
M Danzer (GER); S Klee (GER)	6	6	5
N Araya (CHI); C Muñoz (CHI)	4	3	5
V Sheth (USA); E Tan (USA)	11	11	11

Round of 16
B Chan (HKG); Wong HT (HKG)	11	11	11
V Sheth (USA); E Tan (USA)	7	6	4

=== Section 6 ===
Round of 128
J Zelinka (SVK); E Labošová (SVK)	11	11	8	12
J Magalhães (POR); P Santos (POR)	4	9	11	10

Round of 64
E Ionescu (ROU); I Sîngeorzan (ROU)	7	6	6
V Sidorenko (AIN); E Abraamian (AIN)	11	11	11
J Zelinka (SVK); E Labošová (SVK)	11	11	11
E Jiménez (ECU); D Sanmartin (ECU)	5	2	4
T Yeung (CAN); C Liu (CAN)	8	11	11	11
N Samadzade (AZE); S Mammadova (AZE)	11	8	6	2
Lee De (KOR); Gwon Yh (KOR)	2	6	6
V Picard (FRA); I Cok (FRA)	11	11	11

Round of 32
V Sidorenko (AIN); E Abraamian (AIN)	11	11	11
J Zelinka (SVK); E Labošová (SVK)	8	8	4
T Yeung (CAN); C Liu (CAN)	6	4	7
V Picard (FRA); I Cok (FRA)	11	11	11

Round of 16
V Sidorenko (AIN); E Abraamian (AIN)	11	11	11
V Picard (FRA); I Cok (FRA)	6	7	3

=== Section 7 ===
Round of 128

Round of 64
A Kenzhigulov (KAZ); Z Akasheva (KAZ)	11	11	12
S Iskandarov (UZB); M Magdieva (UZB)	5	7	10
D Koh (SGP); Tan ZY (SGP)	11	11	11
J Uribe (COL); J Rodríguez (COL)	8	8	5
H Singh (IND); S Saini (IND)	w/o
Vong IK (MAC); Seak HL (MAC)
M Garlini (BRA); S Miyabara (BRA)	0	4	5
Feng Yh (TPE); Tsai Ye (TPE)	11	11	11

Round of 32
A Kenzhigulov (KAZ); Z Akasheva (KAZ)	5	11	11	9	6
D Koh (SGP); Tan ZY (SGP)	11	8	8	11	11
H Singh (IND); S Saini (IND)	5	3	5
Feng Yh (TPE); Tsai Ye (TPE)	11	11	11

Round of 16
D Koh (SGP); Tan ZY (SGP)	3	8	4
Feng Yh (TPE); Tsai Ye (TPE)	11	11	11

=== Section 8 ===
Round of 128

Round of 64
J Yokotani (JPN); S Aoi (JPN)	11	11	11
V Hendahewa (SRI); N Siwrathne (SRI)	3	2	6
E Huzsvár (HUN); A Fejős (HUN)	8	8	11	12	7
T Myandal (MGL); BE Batmunkh (MGL)	11	11	7	10	11
P Tungbovornphichet (THA); J Sawettabut (THA)	10	7	9
J Zandecki (POL); I Sztwiertnia (POL)	12	11	11
U Dursun (TUR); Ö Yılmaz (TUR)	10	6	6
Zeng Bx (CHN); Han Fe (CHN)	12	11	11

Round of 32
J Yokotani (JPN); S Aoi (JPN)	11	11	11
T Myandal (MGL); BE Batmunkh (MGL)	5	3	5
J Zandecki (POL); I Sztwiertnia (POL)	6	6	6
Zeng Bx (CHN); Han Fe (CHN)	11	11	11

Round of 16
J Yokotani (JPN); S Aoi (JPN)	5	3	11	7
Zeng Bx (CHN); Han Fe (CHN)	11	11	5	11

=== Finals ===
Quarterfinals
S Okano (JPN); K Idesawa (JPN)	11	11	11	11
N Thanmathikom (THA); W Tayapitak (THA)	5	8	9	9
M Grebnev (AIN); M Tailakova (AIN)	9	11	9	8	7
Chen Js (CHN); Wang Xt (CHN)	11	9	11	11	11
B Chan (HKG); Wong HT (HKG)	9	8	11	12	7	11	12
V Sidorenko (AIN); E Abraamian (AIN)	11	11	9	10	11	9	10
Feng Yh (TPE); Tsai Ye (TPE)	8	11	11	11	7	11	5
Zeng Bx (CHN); Han Fe (CHN)	11	8	5	13	11	6	11

Semifinals
S Okano (JPN); K Idesawa (JPN)	11	11	12	3	11	3	11
Chen Js (CHN); Wang Xt (CHN)	5	8	10	11	13	11	9
B Chan (HKG); Wong HT (HKG)	11	6	5	11	13	9
Zeng Bx (CHN); Han Fe (CHN)	8	11	11	4	15	11

Final
S Okano (JPN); K Idesawa (JPN)	12	10	7	8	11	14	13
Zeng Bx (CHN); Han Fe (CHN)	10	12	11	11	2	12	11
