= Table tennis at the 2025 Summer Universiade – Women's doubles =

Women's doubles at the 2025 Summer World University Games
- Venue: Messe Essen
- Location: Essen
- Dates: 21―23 July
- Teams: 50

Medalists
gold medal	Han Feier; Wang Xiaotong	China
silver medal	Yang Yiyun; Zhao Shang	China
bronze medal	Chien Tung-chuan; Tsai Yun-en	Chinese Taipei
bronze medal	Isà Cok; Camille Lutz	France

The women's doubles at the 2025 Summer World University Games in Rhine-Ruhr, Germany was held from 21 to 23 July 2025. Han Feier and Wang Xiaotong from China won the gold medal. Yang Yiyun and Zhao Shang from China earned the silver medal. The two bronze medals were awarded to Chien Tung-chuan and Tsai Yun-en from Chinese Taipei and Isà Cok and Camille Lutz from France.

== Schedule ==
All times are Central European Time (UTC+1)

Date	Round
21 July	Round of 64
22 July	Round of 32
22 July	Round of 16
23 July	Quarterfinals
23 July	Semifinals
23 July	Final

== Knockout stage ==
The tournament utilized a single-elimination system from the very first round. Unlike the singles events, there was no group stage or round-robin play. Both pairs that lost in the semifinal round automatically received bronze medals. Each individual game was played to 11 points. A pair had to win by a margin of at least two clear points to secure a game. Matches across the tournament were played using a best-of-seven games (sets) format. The first pair to win 4 games won the match and advanced to the next round.

=== Section 1 ===
Round of 64
K Abilzade (AZE); Z Mikayilova (AZE)	11	11	11
D Fuentes (CHI); I Olivares (CHI)	8	9	6
Cheung PM (MAC); Seak HL (MAC)	4	5	4
L Lachenmayer (GER); Y Tsutsui (GER)	11	11	11
L Azar (LBN); M El-Habech (LBN)	4	7	7
A Chiriacova (MDA); C Merenco (MDA)	11	11	11
E Abraamian (AIN); M Tailakova (AIN)	11	10	11	11
J Sung (USA); A Tan (USA)	5	12	6	6

Round of 32
Han Fe (CHN); Wang Xt (CHN)	11	11	11
K Abilzade (AZE); Z Mikayilova (AZE)	9	3	4
L Lachenmayer (GER); Y Tsutsui (GER)	11	11	11
D Jorgseska (NED); S Men (NED)	3	9	4
A Węgrzyn (POL); K Węgrzyn (POL)	11	11	11
A Chiriacova (MDA); C Merenco (MDA)	4	7	7
E Abraamian (AIN); M Tailakova (AIN)	4	9	9
Ng WL (HKG); Wong HT (HKG)	11	12	11

Round of 16
Han Fe (CHN); Wang Xt (CHN)	11	11	11
L Lachenmayer (GER); Y Tsutsui (GER)	7	9	6
A Węgrzyn (POL); K Węgrzyn (POL)	1	6	11	9
Ng WL (HKG); Wong HT (HKG)	11	11	6	11

=== Section 2 ===
Round of 64
D Hudák (HUN); Í Laskai (HUN)	2	11	11	6
A Avezou (FRA); C Picard (FRA)	11	13	8	11
N Grigelová (SVK); E Labošová (SVK)	5	11	11	12
A Teglas (ROU); E Ungvári (ROU)	11	9	7	10
S Saini (IND); P Vartikar (IND)	11	7	10	8
C Lai (SGP); Tan ZY (SGP)	5	11	12	11
Gwon Yh (KOR); Im Ja (KOR)	10	10	11	11	11
N Cai (CAN); CN Fu (CAN)	12	12	7	5	6
A Álzate (COL); J Rodríguez (COL)	9	7	11	5
BE Batmunkh (MGL); BUvgunburged (MGL)	11	11	6	11

Round of 32
Chien Ps (TPE); Tsai Ye (TPE)	11	11	11
A Avezou (FRA); C Picard (FRA)	5	6	3
N Grigelová (SVK); E Labošová (SVK)	12	4	9	11	11
C Lai (SGP); Tan ZY (SGP)	10	11	11	8	13
S Aoi (JPN); K Idesawa (JPN)	11	11	11
Gwon Yh (KOR); Im Ja (KOR)	7	6	6
BE Batmunkh (MGL); B Uvgunburged (MGL)	9	10	13
E Haraç (TUR); Ö Yılmaz (TUR)	11	12	15

Round of 16
Chien Ps (TPE); Tsai Ye (TPE)	11	8	11	11
C Lai (SGP); Tan ZY (SGP)	6	11	5	5
S Aoi (JPN); K Idesawa (JPN)	11	11	17
E Haraç (TUR); Ö Yılmaz (TUR)	2	4	15

=== Section 3 ===
Round of 64
D Espinales (ECU); D Sanmartin (ECU)	6	7	9
Chan LW (SGP); J Cheng (SGP)	11	11	11
H Dari (HUN); A Fejős (HUN)	11	7	11	11
E Ernst (NED); K van Lierop (NED)	7	11	7	9
T Kotecha (IND); S Wani (IND)	11	11	12
M Magdieva (UZB); M Norkulova (UZB)	4	7	10
I Matos (POR); P Santos (POR)	11	11	11
E Walker (AUS); C Quah (AUS)	8	5	8
N Mahmudova (AZE); S Mammadova (AZE)	5	6	4
M Asada (JPN); K Omoda (JPN)	11	11	11

Round of 32
Cheng Ps (TPE); Huang Yj (TPE)	11	11	11
Chan LW (SGP); J Cheng (SGP)	3	6	7
H Dari (HUN); A Fejős (HUN)	9	5	6
I Singeorzan (ROU); E Zaharia (ROU)	11	11	11
T Kotecha (IND); S Wani (IND)	11	11	11
I Matos (POR); P Santos (POR)	7	8	7
M Asada (JPN); K Omoda (JPN)	10	11	5	8
I Cok (FRA); C Lutz (FRA)	12	4	11	11

Round of 16
Cheng Ps (TPE); Huang Yj (TPE)	13	6	6
I Singeorzan (ROU); E Zaharia (ROU)	15	11	11
T Kotecha (IND); S Wani (IND)
I Cok (FRA); C Lutz (FRA)	w/o

=== Section 4 ===
Round of 64
Lee De (KOR); Lee Ej (KOR)	11	7	11	10	11
G Liao (CAN); C Liu (CAN)	5	11	5	12	7
C Infante (CHI); C Muñoz (CHI)	11	11	5	9	11
T Rodrigo (SRI); I Siwratne (SRI)	6	3	11	11	5
E Bat-Erdene (MGL); E Erdenebileg (MGL)	1	5	5
A Brzyska (POL); I Sztwiertnia (POL)	11	11	11
E Tan (USA); A Wang (USA)	7	11	7	11	11
K Alicaya (PHI); A Salar (PHI)	11	8	11	8	9

Round of 32
S Klee (GER); F Schreiner (GER)	9	11	11	11
Lee De (KOR); Lee Ej (KOR)	11	6	3	9
C Infante (CHI); C Muñoz (CHI)	4	4	6
J Sawettabut (THA); W Tayapitak (THA)	11	11	11
Yang Yy (CHN); Zhao S (CHN)	11	6	11	13
A Brzyska (POL); I Sztwiertnia (POL)	4	11	4	11
E Tan (USA); A Wang (USA)	11	11	11
Kong TL (HKG); Lee HM (HKG)	6	4	8

Round of 16
S Klee (GER); F Schreiner (GER)	5	4	11	2
J Sawettabut (THA); W Tayapitak (THA)	11	11	8	11
Yang Yy (CHN); Zhao S (CHN)	11	11	11
Kong TL (HKG); Lee HM (HKG)	8	4	8

=== Finals ===
Quarterfinals
Han Fe (CHN); Wang Xt (CHN)	9	11	9	11	11	11	11
Ng WL (HKG); Wong HT (HKG)	11	4	11	13	2	9	5
Chien Tc (TPE); Tsai Ye (TPE)	11	11	14	11
S Aoi (JPN); K Idesawa (JPN)	6	4	12	6
I Singeorzan (ROU); E Zaharia (ROU)	9	11	5	11	9	17	9
I Cok (FRA); C Lutz (FRA)	11	7	11	6	11	15	11
J Sawettabut (THA); W Tayapitak (THA)	6	5	4	4
Yang Yy (CHN); Zhao S (CHN)	11	11	11	11

Semifinals
Han Fe (CHN); Wang Xt (CHN)	7	11	7	12	11	11
Chien Tc (TPE); Tsai Ye (TPE)	11	7	11	10	6	8
I Cok (FRA); C Lutz (FRA)	0	9	7	14	4
Yang Yy (CHN); Zhao S (CHN)	11	11	11	12	11

Final
Han Fe (CHN); Wang Xt (CHN)	14	11	11	11
Yang Yy (CHN); Zhao S (CHN)	12	9	4	9
