= Table tennis at the 2025 Summer Universiade – Women's team =

Women's team at the 2025 Summer World University Games
- Venue: Messe Essen
- Location: Essen
- Dates: 17―20 July
- Teams: 23

Medalists
gold medal	Sakura Aoi; Mana Asada; Kyoka Idesawa; Kotomi Omoda	Japan
silver medal	Han Feier; Wang Xiaotong; Yang Yiyun; Zhao Shang	China
bronze medal	Cheng Pu-syuan; Chien Tung-chuan; Huang Yu-jie; Tsai Yun-en	Chinese Taipei
bronze medal	Kong Tsz Lam; Lee Hoi Man; Ng Wing Lam; Wong Hoi Tung	Hong Kong

The women's team at the 2025 Summer World University Games in Rhine-Ruhr, Germany was held from 17 to 20 July 2025. Japan won the gold medal. China earned the silver medal. The two bronze medals were awarded to Chinese Taipei and Hong Kong.

== Schedule ==
All times are Central European Time (UTC+1)

Date	Round
17 July	Group Stage
18 July	Group Stage
18 July	Round of 16
19 July	Quarterfinals
19 July	Semifinals
20 July	Final

== Groups stage ==
Teams were divided into groups by drawing lots. They played in a round-robin format (each team playing against all others in their group). The top teams from each group advanced to the main knockout playoff bracket (Round of 16 onwards). Each overall team match utilized a best-of-five format (the first team to win 3 individual matches won the tie). The tie-breaking system consisted of alternating singles (and potentially doubles) matchups. All individual matches within the team event were played as best-of-seven sets (the first player to win 4 sets won the match).

Qualified for Round of 16

=== Group 1 ===
Rank	Team	W	L	MW	ML	GW	GL	PW	PL	CHN	MGL	LBN
1	China	2	0	6	0	18	0	202	77	X	3–0	3–0
2	Mongolia	1	1	3	4	10	14	195	217	0–3	X	3–1
3	Lebanon	0	2	1	6	5	19	156	259	0–3	1–3	X

=== Group 2 ===
Rank	Team	W	L	MW	ML	GW	GL	PW	PL	JPN	THA	TUR
1	Japan	2	0	6	0	18	3	224	143	X	3–0	3–0
2	Thailand	1	1	3	3	10	12	181	208	0–3	X	3–0
3	Turkey	0	2	0	6	5	18	181	235	0–3	0–3	X

=== Group 3 ===
Rank	Team	W	L	MW	ML	GW	GL	PW	PL	TPE	CHI	AUS
1	Chinese Taipei	2	0	6	0	18	0	198	84	X	3–0	3–0
2	Chile	1	1	3	3	9	12	180	198	0–3	X	3–0
3	Australia	0	2	0	6	3	18	136	232	0–3	0–3	X

=== Group 4 ===
Rank	Team	W	L	MW	ML	GW	GL	PW	PL	KOR	USA	AZE
1	South Korea	2	0	6	0	18	4	228	147	X	3–0	3–0
2	United States	1	1	3	3	13	9	201	179	0–3	X	3–0
3	Azerbaijan	0	2	0	6	0	18	95	198	0–3	0–3	X

=== Group 5 ===
Rank	Team	W	L	MW	ML	GW	GL	PW	PL	ROU	IND	NED
1	Romania	2	0	6	3	21	13	336	280	X	3–2	3–1
2	India	1	1	5	4	17	17	314	301	2–3	X	3–1
3	Netherlands	0	2	2	6	12	20	248	317	1–3	1–3	X

=== Group 6 ===
Rank	Team	W	L	MW	ML	GW	GL	PW	PL	HKG	POL	SGP	CAN
1	Hong Kong	3	0	9	2	34	8	383	266	X	3–1	3–1	3–0
2	Poland	2	1	7	3	23	15	347	330	1–3	X	3–0	3–0
3	Singapore	1	2	4	7	17	22	360	338	1–3	0–3	X	3–1
4	Canada	0	3	1	9	4	33	197	353	0–3	0–3	1–3	X

=== Group 7 ===
Rank	Team	W	L	MW	ML	GW	GL	PW	PL	FRA	GER	SVK	HUN
1	France	3	0	9	2	31	12	439	343	X	3–1	3–1	3–0
2	Germany	2	1	7	4	27	17	439	376	1–3	X	3–1	3–0
3	Slovakia	1	2	5	6	17	23	348	372	1–3	1–3	X	3–0
4	Hungary	0	3	0	9	4	27	193	328	0–3	0–3	0–3	X

== Knockout stage ==
The stage officially kicked off with the round of 16. Top-performing countries from the initial round-robin group phase advanced into this single-elimination bracket based on their final group placements and seeding. Once a team entered the knockout phase, one loss meant immediate elimination from gold-medal contention. Winners advanced sequentially through the quarterfinals, semifinals, and the final. Following standard international collegiate rules, there was no third-place bronze medal playoff match. Both losing semifinalists automatically secured a shared bronze medal.

Round of 16
China	3	3	3
Slovakia	0	0	0
Thailand	3	3	1	3
United States	0	0	3	1
France	2	3	1	3	0
India	3	0	3	0	3
Poland	1	2	0
Chinese Taipei	3	3	3
South Korea	3	1	0	3	0
Germany	0	3	3	1	3
Mongolia	0	0	0
Hong Kong	3	3	3
Romania	3	3	3
Chile	0	0	0
Singapore	0	0	0
Japan	3	3	3

Quarterfinals
China	3	3	3
Thailand	0	0	0
India	1	2	0
Chinese Taipei	3	3	3
Germany	3	1	1	1
Hong Kong	0	3	3	3
Romania	2	0	0
Japan	3	3	3

Semifinals
China	3	3	3
Chinese Taipei	0	0	2
Hong Kong	0	0	3	0
Japan	3	3	0	3

Final
China	0	3	3	0	0
Japan	3	1	1	3	3
