= Table tennis at the 2025 Summer Universiade – Men's team =

Men's team at the 2025 Summer World University Games
- Venue: Messe Essen
- Location: Essen
- Dates: 17―20 July
- Teams: 24

Medalists
| gold medal | Chang Ping-cheng; Feng Yi-hsin; Huang Yan-cheng; Kao Cheng-jui | Chinese Taipei |
| silver medal | Ao Hualei; Chen Junsong; Sun Zheng; Zeng Beixun | China |
| bronze medal | Matthias Danzer; Kirill Fadeev; Timotius Köchling; Benno Oehme | Germany |
| bronze medal | Shunsuke Okano; Yuma Tanigaki; Kanta Tokuda; Jo Yokotani | Japan |

The men's team at the 2025 Summer World University Games in Rhine-Ruhr, Germany was held from 17 to 20 July 2025. Chinese Taipei won the gold medal. China earned the silver medal. The two bronze medals were awarded to Germany and Japan.

== Schedule ==
All times are Central European Time (UTC+1)

| Date | Round |
|---|---|
| 17 July | Group Stage |
| 18 July | Group Stage |
| 18 July | Round of 16 |
| 19 July | Quarterfinals |
| 19 July | Semifinals |
| 20 July | Final |

== Groups stage ==
Teams were divided into groups by drawing lots. They played in a round-robin format (each team playing against all others in their group). The top teams from each group advanced to the main knockout playoff bracket (Round of 16 onwards). Each overall team match utilized a best-of-five format (the first team to win 3 individual matches won the tie). The tie-breaking system consisted of alternating singles (and potentially doubles) matchups. All individual matches within the team event were played as best-of-seven sets (the first player to win 4 sets won the match).

| Qualified for Round of 16 |

=== Group 1 ===
| Rank | Team | W | L | MW | ML | GW | GL | PW | PL | CHN | BEL | TUR |
|---|---|---|---|---|---|---|---|---|---|---|---|---|
| 1 | China | 2 | 0 | 6 | 0 | 18 | 6 | 250 | 186 | X | 3–0 | 3–0 |
| 2 | Belgium | 1 | 1 | 3 | 4 | 12 | 15 | 244 | 274 | 0–3 | X | 3–1 |
| 3 | Turkey | 0 | 2 | 1 | 6 | 10 | 19 | 266 | 300 | 0–3 | 1–3 | X |

=== Group 2 ===
| Rank | Team | W | L | MW | ML | GW | GL | PW | PL | TPE | MAC | IRL |
|---|---|---|---|---|---|---|---|---|---|---|---|---|
| 1 | Chinese Taipei | 2 | 0 | 6 | 0 | 18 | 0 | 198 | 64 | X | 3–0 | 3–0 |
| 2 | Macau | 1 | 1 | 3 | 3 | 9 | 10 | 140 | 158 | 0–3 | X | 3–0 |
| 3 | Ireland | 0 | 2 | 0 | 6 | 1 | 18 | 90 | 206 | 0–3 | 0–3 | X |

=== Group 3 ===
| Rank | Team | W | L | MW | ML | GW | GL | PW | PL | JPN | IND | COL |
|---|---|---|---|---|---|---|---|---|---|---|---|---|
| 1 | Japan | 2 | 0 | 6 | 0 | 18 | 2 | 216 | 125 | X | 3–0 | 3–0 |
| 2 | India | 1 | 1 | 3 | 5 | 9 | 16 | 203 | 248 | 0–3 | X | 3–2 |
| 3 | Colombia | 0 | 2 | 2 | 6 | 9 | 18 | 221 | 267 | 0–3 | 2–3 | X |

=== Group 4 ===
| Rank | Team | W | L | MW | ML | GW | GL | PW | PL | GER | HUN | MGL |
|---|---|---|---|---|---|---|---|---|---|---|---|---|
| 1 | Germany | 2 | 0 | 6 | 1 | 19 | 8 | 263 | 191 | X | 3–1 | 3–0 |
| 2 | Hungary | 1 | 1 | 4 | 3 | 17 | 13 | 266 | 262 | 1–3 | X | 3–0 |
| 3 | Mongolia | 0 | 2 | 0 | 6 | 3 | 18 | 148 | 224 | 0–3 | 0–3 | X |

=== Group 5 ===
| Rank | Team | W | L | MW | ML | GW | GL | PW | PL | ROU | SUI | AUS |
|---|---|---|---|---|---|---|---|---|---|---|---|---|
| 1 | Romania | 2 | 0 | 6 | 0 | 18 | 4 | 230 | 153 | X | 3–0 | 3–0 |
| 2 | Switzerland | 1 | 1 | 3 | 3 | 12 | 9 | 200 | 176 | 0–3 | X | 3–0 |
| 3 | Australia | 0 | 2 | 0 | 6 | 1 | 18 | 109 | 210 | 0–3 | 0–3 | X |

=== Group 6 ===
| Rank | Team | W | L | MW | ML | GW | GL | PW | PL | HKG | POL | KSA |
|---|---|---|---|---|---|---|---|---|---|---|---|---|
| 1 | Hong Kong | 2 | 0 | 6 | 2 | 20 | 9 | 283 | 247 | X | 3–1 | 3–1 |
| 2 | Poland | 1 | 1 | 4 | 3 | 14 | 13 | 248 | 235 | 1–3 | X | 3–0 |
| 3 | Saudi Arabia | 0 | 2 | 1 | 6 | 8 | 20 | 239 | 288 | 1–3 | 0–3 | X |

=== Group 7 ===
| Rank | Team | W | L | MW | ML | GW | GL | PW | PL | KOR | SGP | NED |
|---|---|---|---|---|---|---|---|---|---|---|---|---|
| 1 | South Korea | 2 | 0 | 6 | 1 | 19 | 8 | 278 | 217 | X | 3–1 | 3–0 |
| 2 | Singapore | 1 | 1 | 4 | 3 | 16 | 12 | 264 | 241 | 1–3 | X | 3–0 |
| 3 | Netherlands | 0 | 2 | 0 | 6 | 3 | 18 | 140 | 224 | 0–3 | 0–3 | X |

=== Group 8 ===
| Rank | Team | W | L | MW | ML | GW | GL | PW | PL | USA | CHI | AZE |
|---|---|---|---|---|---|---|---|---|---|---|---|---|
| 1 | United States | 2 | 0 | 6 | 0 | 18 | 1 | 208 | 71 | X | 3–0 | 3–0 |
| 2 | Chile | 1 | 1 | 3 | 4 | 12 | 12 | 187 | 203 | 0–3 | X | 3–1 |
| 3 | Azerbaijan | 0 | 2 | 1 | 6 | 3 | 20 | 125 | 246 | 0–3 | 1–3 | X |

== Knockout stage ==
The stage officially kicked off with the round of 16. Top-performing countries from the initial round-robin group phase advanced into this single-elimination bracket based on their final group placements and seeding. Once a team entered the knockout phase, one loss meant immediate elimination from gold-medal contention. Winners advanced sequentially through the quarterfinals, semifinals, and the final. Following standard international collegiate rules, there was no third-place bronze medal playoff match. Both losing semifinalists automatically secured a shared bronze medal.

Round of 16
China | 3 | 3 | 3
India | 0 | 1 | 1
Macau | 1 | 0 | 0
Romania | 3 | 3 | 3
Hong Kong | 3 | 3 | 3
Chile | 0 | 0 | 0
Singapore | 1 | 2 | 0
Germany | 3 | 3 | 3
Japan | 0 | 3 | 3 | 3
Hungary | 3 | 0 | 1 | 1
Belgium | 3 | 3 | 3
United States | 2 | 0 | 0
South Korea | 3 | 3 | 1 | 3
Switzerland | 1 | 1 | 3 | 0
Poland | 0 | 0 | 0
Chinese Taipei | 3 | 3 | 3

Quarterfinals
China | 1 | 3 | 3 | 3
Romania | 3 | 0 | 1 | 2
Hong Kong | 1 | 3 | 1 | 3 | 2
Germany | 3 | 0 | 3 | 1 | 3
Japan | 3 | 3 | 3
Belgium | 0 | 0 | 0
South Korea | 0 | 0 | 0
Chinese Taipei | 3 | 3 | 3

Semifinals
China | 3 | 3 | 3
Germany | 0 | 2 | 0
Japan | 1 | 1 | 3 | 2
Chinese Taipei | 3 | 3 | 1 | 3

Final
Chinese Taipei | 3 | 1 | 3 | 1 | 3
China | 1 | 3 | 1 | 3 | 2
