= Swimming at the 2025 Summer World University Games – Men's 100 metre backstroke =

Men's 100 metre backstroke at the 2025 Summer World University Games
- Venue: Schwimm- und Sprunghalle im Europasportpark
- Location: Berlin
- Dates: 18 July (heats and semifinals); 19 July (final)
- Competitors: 41 from 29 nations

Medalists
gold medal	Pieter Coetze	South Africa
silver medal	William Modglin	United States
bronze medal	Daniel Diehl	United States

The men's 100 metre backstroke at the 2025 Summer World University Games in Rhine-Ruhr, Germany was held from 18 to 19 July 2025. Pieter Coetze from South Africa won the gold medal, William Modglin from the United States took the silver medal and Daniel Diehl from the United States earned the bronze medal.

== Schedule ==
All times are Central European Time (UTC+1)

Date	Time	Round
18 July	10:23	Heats
18 July	19:42	Semifinals
19 July	19:07	Final

== Records ==
Prior to the competition, the world and Universiade records were as follows.

Category	Swimmer	Record	Date	Place	Event
World record	(Italy) Thomas Ceccon	51.60	20 June 2022	Budapest, Hungary	2022 World Championships
Universiade record	(Japan) Ryosuke Irie	52.60	6 July 2009	Belgrade, Serbia	2009 Summer Universiade

== Results ==
=== Heats ===
All entered athletes competed across multiple seeded heats in the morning session. Swimmers with the top 16 fastest times advanced, regardless of which individual heat they swam.

Rank	Heat	Lane	Swimmer	Nation	Time	Notes
1	6	4	Pieter Coetze	South Africa	53.34	Q
2	6	5	William Modglin	United States	53.47	Q
3	5	4	Daniel Diehl	United States	53.60	Q
4	6	3	Mathys Chouchaoui	France	54.29	Q
5	5	5	Yusuke Sato	Japan	54.41	Q
6	5	3	Pietro Ubertalli	Italy	54.46	Q
7	4	4	Aleksei Tkachev	Individual Neutral Athletes	54.56	Q
8	5	6	Yuga Nishimura	Japan	54.69	Q
9	4	5	Jules Andre	France	54.79	Q
10	4	3	Cornelius Jahn	Germany	54.87	Q
11	6	2	Chuang Mu-lun	Chinese Taipei	55.23	Q
12	3	4	Kajus Stankevičius	Lithuania	55.27	Q
13	6	6	Yoon Ji-hwan	South Korea	55.42	Q
14	6	7	Erikas Grigaitis	Lithuania	55.50	Q
15	4	1	Hayden Kwan	Hong Kong	55.51	Q
15	5	7	Aleksander Sienkiewicz	Poland	55.51	Q
17	5	2	Filip Kosiński	Poland	55.61	
18	5	8	Primož Senica	Slovenia	55.76	
19	6	1	Stuart Swinburn	Australia	55.79	
20	4	2	Alexandru Constantinescu	Romania	55.83	
21	3	5	Oskar Schildknecht	Germany	55.89	
22	5	1	Pablo Ortega	Spain	55.92	
23	3	2	Leon Opatril	Austria	56.00	
24	4	7	Kim Min-jun	South Korea	56.19	
25	6	8	Nicolás Garcia	Spain	56.27	
26	4	8	Ng Cheuk Yin	Hong Kong	56.74	
27	2	5	Elías Ardiles	Chile	57.23	
28	3	6	Charlie Skoglund	Sweden	57.32	
29	2	3	Nithik Nathella	India	57.43	
30	3	7	Steven Jaramillo	Ecuador	58.15	
31	3	3	Ahmad Safie	Lebanon	58.39	
32	3	1	Daniil Sokolovskiy	Switzerland	58.71	
33	2	4	Rashad Alguliyev	Azerbaijan	58.79	
34	3	8	Germans Čiļeks	Latvia	59.03	
35	2	2	Patricio Bobadilla	Chile	59.19	
36	1	4	Emerson Pinto	Ecuador	1:01.90	
37	1	3	Nihad Yusibov	Azerbaijan	1:02.55	
38	2	7	Andreas Soosaar	Estonia	1:02.71	
39	2	6	Tselmeg Khash-Erdene	Mongolia	1:04.58	
40	1	5	Jesse Okumu	Kenya	1:12.40	
—	4	6	Ruard van Renen	South Africa	DSQ	

=== Semifinals ===
The 16 advancing swimmers were split into two semifinal heats of 8 during the evening session. The swimmers recording the top 8 fastest times advanced to the final round.

Rank	Heat	Lane	Swimmer	Nation	Time	Notes
1	2	4	Pieter Coetze	South Africa	52.18	Q
2	1	4	William Modglin	United States	52.75	Q
3	2	5	Daniel Diehl	United States	53.48	Q
4	1	5	Mathys Chouchaoui	France	53.70	Q
5	2	2	Jules Andre	France	53.95	Q
6	2	6	Aleksei Tkachev	Individual Neutral Athletes	54.34	Q
7	1	3	Pietro Ubertalli	Italy	54.48	Q
8	1	6	Yuga Nishimura	Japan	54.57	Q
9	2	3	Yusuke Sato	Japan	54.67	
10	1	2	Cornelius Jahn	Germany	54.72	
11	1	1	Erikas Grigaitis	Lithuania	55.04	
12	1	8	Aleksander Sienkiewicz	Poland	55.05	
13	2	7	Chuang Mu-lun	Chinese Taipei	55.15	
14	1	7	Kajus Stankevičius	Lithuania	55.19	
15	2	1	Yoon Ji-hwan	South Korea	55.53	
16	2	8	Hayden Kwan	Hong Kong	55.99	

=== Final ===
The fastest 8 swimmers competed in a single race to determine the gold, silver and bronze medalists.

Rank	Lane	Swimmer	Nation	Time	Notes
1st place, gold medalist(s)	4	Pieter Coetze	South Africa	51.99	FR
2nd place, silver medalist(s)	5	William Modglin	United States	52.54	
3rd place, bronze medalist(s)	3	Daniel Diehl	United States	52.94	
4	2	Jules Andre	France	53.89	
5	6	Mathys Chouchaoui	France	54.09	
6	7	Aleksei Tkachev	Individual Neutral Athletes	54.42	
6	8	Yuga Nishimura	Japan	54.42	
8	1	Pietro Ubertalli	Italy	54.44	
