= Badminton at the 2025 Summer World University Games – Men's doubles =

Men's doubles at the 2025 Summer World University Games
- Venue: Westenergie Sporthalle
- Location: Mülheim, Germany
- Dates: 22–26 July 2025
- Competitors: 100 from 31 nations

Medalists
gold medal	Jin Yong (KOR); Lee Jong-min (KOR)
silver medal	Cui Hechen (CHN); Peng Jianqin (CHN)
bronze medal	Peeratchai Sukphun (THA); Pakkapon Teeraratsakul (THA)
bronze medal	Liao Pinyi (CHN); Zhang Lejian (CHN)

The men's doubles badminton event at the 2025 Summer World University Games was held from 22 to 26 July at the Westenergie Sporthalle in Mülheim, Germany. A total of 100 competitors from 31 nations participated in the event.

== Draw ==
The draw published on 21 July 2025.

=== Finals ===
Semifinals
Peeratchai Sukphun (THA); Pakkapon Teeraratsakul (THA)	13	15	8
Cui Hechen (CHN); Peng Jianqin (CHN)	15	13	15
Liao Pinyi (CHN); Zhang Lejian (CHN)	7	9
Jin Yong (KOR); Lee Jong-min (KOR)	15	15

Final
Cui Hechen (CHN); Peng Jianqin (CHN)	10	10
Jin Yong (KOR); Lee Jong-min (KOR)	15	15

=== Top half ===
==== Section 1 ====
First round
M Esteve (ESP); Á Leal (ESP)	15	15
A Lee (USA); S Li (USA)	12	11
Su L-y (TPE); Ting Y-c (TPE)	15	15
R Dorji (BHU); A Pradhan (BHU)	7	8
V Kuvale (IND); A Mohanty (IND)	15	14	8
K Masumoto (JPN); R Miyashita (JPN)	13	16	15

Second round
P Sukphun (THA); P Teeraratsakul (THA)	15	15
T Budak (TUR); N Saraç (TUR)	10	4
K Meusburger (AUT); I Nicoluss (AUT)	10	11
M Esteve (ESP); Á Leal (ESP)	15	15
Chen C-k (TPE); Wu H-y (TPE)	15	15
Su L-y (TPE); Ting Y-c (TPE)	8	7
R Pavlík (SVK); S Suchý (SVK)	8	12
K Masumoto (JPN); R Miyashita (JPN)	15	15

Third round
P Sukphun (THA); P Teeraratsakul (THA)	15	15
M Esteve (ESP); Á Leal (ESP)	11	6
Chen C-k (TPE); Wu H-y (TPE)	15	15
K Masumoto (JPN); R Miyashita (JPN)	10	7

Quarterfinals
P Sukphun (THA); P Teeraratsakul (THA)	15	10	15
Chen C-k (TPE); Wu H-y (TPE)	13	15	13

==== Section 2 ====
First round
S Sato (JPN); T Yoshida (JPN)	15	15
Liew X (MAS); Wee Y H (MAS)	12	10
Z Dulcz (HUN); B Kiss (HUN)
V Reva (UKR); D Shcherbatiuk (UKR)
Chan C L (HKG); Lau S H (HKG)	15	15
D Franco (ESP); C Piris (ESP)	4	12
Kang G-h (KOR); Park S-m (KOR)	14	17	13
K Minamoto (JPN); O Sakurai (JPN)	16	15	15

Second round
B Goonting (MAS); Fazriq R (MAS)	9	7
S Sato (JPN); T Yoshida (JPN)	15	15
J Wang (AUS); O Zhao (AUS)	11	15	15
V Reva (UKR); D Shcherbatiuk (UKR)	15	11	12
Cui HC (CHN); Peng JQ (CHN)	15	15
Chan C L (HKG); Lau S H (HKG)	11	6
B Butkus (POL); J Wilczak (POL)	6	9
K Minamoto (JPN); O Sakurai (JPN)	15	15

Third round
S Sato (JPN); T Yoshida (JPN)	15	15
J Wang (AUS); O Zhao (AUS)	8	12
Cui HC (CHN); Peng JQ (CHN)	15	17
K Minamoto (JPN); O Sakurai (JPN)	13	15

Quarterfinals
S Sato (JPN); T Yoshida (JPN)	9	10
Cui HC (CHN); Peng JQ (CHN)	15	15

=== Bottom half ===
==== Section 3 ====
First round
N Begga (FRA); B Labarthe (FRA)	15	15
T Phang (SGP); Sim J B (SGP)	11	5
O Lucky Steven (NGR); B Umar (NGR)	7	8
J Fernández (ESP); V Gázquez (ESP)	15	15
J Dresp (GER); S Krax (GER)	15	15
Y Saigh (KSA); A Sardar (KSA)	6	4
V Lai (CAN); J Tang (CAN)	15	15
K Khanal (NEP); A Malla (NEP)	7	11

Second round
N Begga (FRA); B Labarthe (FRA)	15	15
S Dayanand (IND); D Pujari (IND)	7	8
J Fernández (ESP); V Gázquez (ESP)	7	7
Liao PY (CHN); Zhang LJ (CHN)	15	15
J Dresp (GER); S Krax (GER)	13	14
M Bourakkadi (GER); D Eckerlin (GER)	15	16
V Lai (CAN); J Tang (CAN)	3	11
M Cattoen (FRA); L Renoir (FRA)	15	15

Third round
N Begga (FRA); B Labarthe (FRA)	11	13
Liao PY (CHN); Zhang LJ (CHN)	15	15
M Bourakkadi (GER); D Eckerlin (GER)	10	15	20
M Cattoen (FRA); L Renoir (FRA)	15	12	21

Quarterfinals
Liao PY (CHN); Zhang LJ (CHN)	15	12	15
M Cattoen (FRA); L Renoir (FRA)	7	15	9

==== Section 4 ====
First round
T Gatdula (PHI); D Orara (PHI)	11	8
T van der Lecq (NED); B Wassink (NED)	15	15
D Ng (SGP); J Sim (SGP)	19	15
N Mills (CAN); H Tan (CAN)	17	10
Ba Pápai (HUN); Bá Pápai (HUN)	11	7
A Chim (USA); A Yuan (USA)	15	15

Second round
T van der Lecq (NED); B Wassink (NED)	15	15
Pui C C (MAC); Vong K W (MAC)	4	7
D Ng (SGP); J Sim (SGP)	6	7
Jin Y (KOR); Lee J-m (KOR)	15	15
A Chim (USA); A Yuan (USA)	15	15
M Lim (SGP); N Yap (SGP)	5	7
N Saengkham (THA); A Teerawiwat (THA)	11	15	13
Chen Z-r (TPE); Lin Y-c (TPE)	15	11	15

Third round
T van der Lecq (NED); B Wassink (NED)	7	6
Jin Y (KOR); Lee J-m (KOR)	15	15
A Chim (USA); A Yuan (USA)	8	10
Chen Z-r (TPE); Lin Y-c (TPE)	15	15

Quarterfinals
Jin Y (KOR); Lee J-m (KOR)	15	15
Chen Z-r (TPE); Lin Y-c (TPE)	6	11
