= Swimming at the 2025 Summer World University Games – Women's 50 metre freestyle =

Women's 50 metre freestyle at the 2025 Summer World University Games
- Venue: Schwimm- und Sprunghalle im Europasportpark
- Location: Berlin
- Dates: 22 July (heats and semifinals); 23 July (final)
- Competitors: 54 from 36 nations

Medalists
gold medal	Maxine Parker	United States
silver medal	Julia Dennis	United States
bronze medal	Olivia Nel	South Africa

The women's 50 metre freestyle at the 2025 Summer World University Games in Rhine-Ruhr, Germany was held from 22 to 23 July 2025. Maxine Parker from the United States won the gold medal, Julia Dennis from the United States took the silver medal and Olivia Nel from South Africa earned the bronze medal.

== Schedule ==
All times are Central European Time (UTC+1)

Date	Time	Round
22 July	09:20	Heats
22 July	21:04	Semifinals
23 July	19:36	Final

== Records ==
Prior to the competition, the world and Universiade records were as follows.

Category	Swimmer	Record	Date	Place	Event
World record	(Sweden) Sarah Sjöström	23.61	29 July 2023	Fukuoka, Japan	2023 World Championships
Universiade record	(China) Zhang Yufei	24.29	7 August 2023	Chengdu, China	2021 Summer World University Games

== Results ==
=== Heats ===
All entered athletes competed across multiple seeded heats in the morning session. Swimmers with the top 16 fastest times advanced, regardless of which individual heat they swam.

Rank	Heat	Lane	Swimmer	Nation	Time	Notes
1	6	4	Julia Dennis	United States	24.88	Q
2	7	4	Maxine Parker	United States	24.96	Q
3	5	5	Lison Nowaczyk	France	25.30	Q
3	6	3	Viola Di Carlo	Italy	25.30	Q
5	7	6	Agata Ambler	Italy	25.33	Q
6	7	3	Olivia Nel	South Africa	25.39	Q
7	6	2	Beatrix Tankó	Hungary	25.48	Q
7	6	5	Britta Koehorst	Netherlands	25.48	Q
9	7	5	Julia Maik	Poland	25.54	Q
10	5	4	Kalia Antoniou	Cyprus	25.58	Q
11	5	2	Liu Shuhan	China	25.59	Q
12	7	2	Chiu Yi-chen	Chinese Taipei	25.66	Q
13	7	8	Adrianna Szwabińska	Poland	25.68	Q
14	5	6	Ayu Mizoguchi	Japan	25.70	Q
15	7	7	Josephine Crimmins	Australia	25.74	Q
16	6	6	Michaela de Villiers	South Africa	25.82	Q
17	7	1	Liu Pei-yin	Chinese Taipei	25.89	
18	5	7	Yeo Chiok Sze	Singapore	25.93	
19	6	7	Anna Hadjiloizou	Cyprus	26.01	
20	6	1	Rio Suzuki	Japan	26.11	
21	4	5	Angélique Brugger	Switzerland	26.23	
22	5	1	Kiia Metsäkonkola	Finland	26.24	
23	5	8	Hanna Bergman	Sweden	26.25	
24	4	7	Ju U-yeong	South Korea	26.30	
25	4	4	Jemima Hall	Great Britain	26.33	
26	4	2	Paige van der Westhuizen	Zimbabwe	26.40	
27	5	3	Delia Lloyd	Canada	26.42	
28	4	8	Zora Ripková	Slovakia	26.75	
29	3	3	Kayley Goh	Singapore	26.86	
30	4	3	Hong Jin-yeong	South Korea	26.96	
31	6	8	Emma O'Croinin	Canada	26.97	
32	3	4	Maysa Raţiu	Romania	27.05	
33	3	5	Tia Primc	Slovenia	27.10	
34	3	6	Sabína Kupčová	Slovakia	27.36	
35	3	8	Karolin Kotsar	Estonia	27.43	
36	3	1	Haley Sakbun	Cambodia	27.53	
37	1	2	Eliane Saade	Lebanon	27.54	
38	2	5	Kuok Hei Cheng	Macau	27.55	
38	3	7	Nina Venkatesh	India	27.55	
40	4	6	Cornelia Pammer	Austria	27.72	
41	4	1	Fernanda Reyes	Chile	27.79	
42	2	7	Kimberly Uyaguari	Ecuador	27.94	
43	1	7	Aixa Recchioni	Argentina	28.11	
44	3	2	Fatima Alkaramova	Azerbaijan	28.14	
45	2	3	Latiesha Mandanna	India	28.34	
46	2	4	Heleriin Haljaste	Estonia	28.42	
47	2	6	Kristiāna Maskava-Pudāne	Latvia	28.60	
48	2	2	Kuan I Cheng	Macau	28.65	
49	1	6	Catalina Bustamante	Chile	29.29	
50	1	3	Eliana Martini	Argentina	29.70	
51	2	1	Adriana Matute	Ecuador	30.30	
52	2	8	Oyun-erdene Jadambaa	Mongolia	32.86	
53	1	4	Altjin Amgalan	Mongolia	33.52	
54	1	5	Dorah Nankunda	Uganda	40.54	

=== Semifinals ===
The 16 advancing swimmers were split into two semifinal heats of 8 during the evening session. The swimmers recording the top 8 fastest times advanced to the final round.

Rank	Heat	Lane	Swimmer	Nation	Time	Notes
1	2	4	Julia Dennis	United States	24.55	Q
2	1	3	Olivia Nel	South Africa	24.96	Q
3	2	5	Viola Di Carlo	Italy	25.01	Q
4	1	4	Maxine Parker	United States	25.03	Q
5	1	5	Lison Nowaczyk	France	25.10	Q
6	2	6	Beatrix Tankó	Hungary	25.12	Q
7	2	3	Agata Ambler	Italy	25.20	Q
8	1	2	Kalia Antoniou	Cyprus	25.21	Q
9	1	6	Britta Koehorst	Netherlands	25.27	
10	2	7	Liu Shuhan	China	25.35	
11	2	2	Julia Maik	Poland	25.41	
12	1	7	Chiu Yi-chen	Chinese Taipei	25.42	
13	2	8	Josephine Crimmins	Australia	25.44	
14	1	1	Ayu Mizoguchi	Japan	25.51	
15	2	1	Adrianna Szwabińska	Poland	25.77	
16	1	8	Michaela de Villiers	South Africa	25.84	

=== Final ===
The fastest 8 swimmers competed in a single race to determine the gold, silver and bronze medalists.

Rank	Lane	Swimmer	Nation	Time	Notes
1st place, gold medalist(s)	6	Maxine Parker	United States	24.54	
2nd place, silver medalist(s)	4	Julia Dennis	United States	24.58	
3rd place, bronze medalist(s)	5	Olivia Nel	South Africa	24.82	
4	3	Viola Di Carlo	Italy	24.84	
5	1	Agata Ambler	Italy	25.03	
6	8	Kalia Antoniou	Cyprus	25.16	
7	7	Beatrix Tankó	Hungary	25.22	
8	2	Lison Nowaczyk	France	25.23	
