= Swimming at the 2025 Summer World University Games – Men's 50 metre backstroke =

Men's 50 metre backstroke at the 2025 Summer World University Games
- Venue: Schwimm- und Sprunghalle im Europasportpark
- Location: Berlin
- Dates: 20 July (heats and semifinals); 21 July (final)
- Competitors: 50 from 32 nations

Medalists
gold medal	Pieter Coetze	South Africa
silver medal	Yoon Ji-hwan	South Korea
bronze medal	Daniel Diehl	United States

The men's 50 metre backstroke at the 2025 Summer World University Games in Rhine-Ruhr, Germany was held from 20 to 21 July 2025. Pieter Coetze from South Africa won the gold medal, Yoon Ji-hwan from South Korea took the silver medal and Daniel Diehl from the United States earned the bronze medal.

== Schedule ==
All times are Central European Time (UTC+1)

Date	Time	Round
20 July	09:39	Heats
20 July	20:01	Semifinals
21 July	20:30	Final

== Records ==
Prior to the competition, the world and Universiade records were as follows.

Category	Swimmer	Record	Date	Place	Event
World record	(Russia) Kliment Kolesnikov	23.55	27 July 2023	Kazan, Russia	2023 Swim Cup Of Russia
Universiade record	(South Africa) Zane Waddell	24.46	6 July 2019	Naples, Italy	2019 Summer Universiade

== Results ==
=== Heats ===
All entered athletes competed across multiple seeded heats in the morning session. Swimmers with the top 16 fastest times advanced, regardless of which individual heat they swam.

Rank	Heat	Lane	Swimmer	Nation	Time	Notes
1	6	4	Pieter Coetze	South Africa	24.69	Q
2	7	4	Yoon Ji-hwan	South Korea	24.74	Q
3	5	4	William Modglin	United States	24.82	Q
4	7	7	Daniel Diehl	United States	24.93	Q
5	6	1	Simone Stefanì	Italy	25.27	Q
6	6	6	Jules Andre	France	25.42	Q
7	5	6	Ruard van Renen	South Africa	25.50	Q
8	5	5	Pablo Ortega	Spain	25.58	Q
8	7	6	Chuang Mu-lun	Chinese Taipei	25.58	Q
10	4	5	Srihari Nataraj	India	25.59	Q
11	7	3	Yusuke Sato	Japan	25.61	Q
11	6	3	Alexandre Desangles	France	25.61	Q
13	6	7	Yuga Nishimura	Japan	25.65	Q
14	7	5	Aleksei Tkachev	Individual Neutral Athletes	25.67	Q
15	6	5	Cornelius Jahn	Germany	25.73	Q
16	5	2	Michał Pruszyński	Poland	25.78	Q
17	6	8	Vidar Carlbaum	Sweden	25.79	
18	3	4	Kajus Stankevičius	Lithuania	25.96	
19	5	8	Oskar Schildknecht	Germany	26.00	
20	5	1	Kim Min-ju	South Korea	26.05	
21	1	5	Elías Ardiles	Chile	26.11	
22	4	6	Noah Retzler	Switzerland	26.15	
23	7	1	Mikhail Kleshko	Uzbekistan	26.21	
23	5	3	Paweł Smoliński	Poland	26.21	
25	4	7	Ng Cheuk Yin	Hong Kong	26.26	
26	4	2	Stuart Swinburn	Australia	26.31	
27	5	7	Gleb Kovalenya	Kazakhstan	26.32	
28	6	2	Alexandru Constantinescu	Romania	26.37	
29	7	8	Erikas Grigaitis	Lithuania	26.41	
30	4	3	Ahmad Safie	Lebanon	26.42	
31	4	4	Maël Allegrini	Switzerland	26.45	
32	4	1	Hayden Kwan	Hong Kong	26.47	
33	4	8	Artur Tobler	Estonia	26.63	
34	2	7	Vadym Naumenko	Ukraine	26.82	
35	3	6	Dhyaan Mahesh	India	26.94	
36	3	5	Germans Čiļeks	Latvia	27.08	
37	3	3	Steven Jaramillo	Ecuador	27.10	
38	3	7	Rashad Alguliyev	Azerbaijan	27.26	
39	3	1	Patricio Bobadilla	Chile	27.34	
40	3	2	Andreas Soosaar	Estonia	27.76	
41	1	3	Agustin Rasche	Argentina	27.88	
42	2	4	Emerson Pinto	Ecuador	28.02	
43	1	4	Rihards Kahanovič	Latvia	28.26	
44	3	8	Kaeden Gleason	Virgin Islands	28.70	
45	2	1	Nihad Yusibov	Azerbaijan	28.97	
46	2	5	Jesse Okumu	Kenya	32.18	
47	2	3	Abdullah Al-Jabri	Oman	33.04	
48	2	2	Juan Silva	Argentina	35.91	
—	7	2	Lorenzo Actis	Italy	DNS	
—	2	6	Bjourn Mhlanga	Zimbabwe	DNS	

=== Semifinals ===
The 16 advancing swimmers were split into two semifinal heats of 8 during the evening session. The swimmers recording the top 8 fastest times advanced to the final round.

Rank	Heat	Lane	Swimmer	Nation	Time	Notes
1	2	4	Pieter Coetze	South Africa	24.50	Q
2	2	5	William Modglin	United States	24.80	Q
3	1	4	Yoon Ji-hwan	South Korea	24.94	Q
3	1	5	Daniel Diehl	United States	24.94	Q
5	2	6	Ruard van Renen	South Africa	25.20	Q
6	1	3	Jules Andre	France	25.34	Q
6	1	7	Alexandre Desangles	France	25.34	Q
8	2	3	Simone Stefanì	Italy	25.36	SO
8	1	6	Pablo Ortega	Spain	25.36	SO
10	2	1	Yuga Nishimura	Japan	25.38	
11	1	2	Srihari Nataraj	India	25.39	
12	1	1	Aleksei Tkachev	Individual Neutral Athletes	25.46	
13	2	2	Chuang Mu-lun	Chinese Taipei	25.58	
13	1	8	Michał Pruszyński	Poland	25.58	
15	2	8	Cornelius Jahn	Germany	25.60	
16	2	7	Yusuke Sato	Japan	25.69	

=== Swim-off ===
The tied swimmers raced to claim the 8th place and final lane in the medal final.

Rank	Lane	Swimmer	Nation	Time	Notes
1	5	Simone Stefanì	Italy	25.31	Q
2	4	Pablo Ortega	Spain	25.39	

=== Final ===
The fastest 8 swimmers competed in a single race to determine the gold, silver and bronze medalists.

Rank	Lane	Swimmer	Nation	Time	Notes
1st place, gold medalist(s)	4	Pieter Coetze	South Africa	24.49	
2nd place, silver medalist(s)	6	Yoon Ji-hwan	South Korea	24.51	
3rd place, bronze medalist(s)	3	Daniel Diehl	United States	24.75	
4	5	William Modglin	United States	24.78	
5	8	Simone Stefanì	Italy	25.04	
6	7	Alexandre Desangles	France	25.14	
7	1	Jules Andre	France	25.19	
8	2	Ruard van Renen	South Africa	25.36	
