= Swimming at the 2025 Summer World University Games – Men's 200 metre breaststroke =

Men's 200 metre breaststroke at the 2025 Summer World University Games
- Venue: Schwimm- und Sprunghalle im Europasportpark
- Location: Berlin
- Dates: 19 July (heats and semifinals); 20 July (final)
- Competitors: 45 from 33 nations

Medalists
gold medal	Benjamin Delmar	United States
silver medal	Adam Mak	Hong Kong
bronze medal	Dawid Wiekiera	Poland

The men's 200 metre breaststroke at the 2025 Summer World University Games in Rhine-Ruhr, Germany was held from 19 to 20 July 2025. Benjamin Delmar from the United States won the gold medal, Adam Mak from Hong Kong took the silver medal and Dawid Wiekiera from Poland earned the bronze medal.

== Schedule ==
All times are Central European Time (UTC+1)

Date	Time	Round
19 July	09:38	Heats
19 July	20:03	Semifinals
20 July	19:37	Final

== Records ==
Prior to the competition, the world and Universiade records were as follows.

Category	Swimmer	Record	Date	Place	Event
World record	(China) Qin Haiyang	2:05.48	28 July 2023	Fukuoka, Japan	2023 World Championships
Universiade record	(China) Qin Haiyang	2:08.09	4 August 2023	Chengdu, China	2021 Summer World University Games

== Results ==
=== Heats ===
All entered athletes competed across multiple seeded heats in the morning session. Swimmers with the top 16 fastest times advanced, regardless of which individual heat they swam.

Rank	Heat	Lane	Swimmer	Nation	Time	Notes
1	5	4	Benjamin Delmar	United States	2:11.05	Q
2	6	5	Joshua Bey	United States	2:12.21	Q
3	5	3	Lee Sang-hoon	South Korea	2:12.36	Q
4	4	6	Guilherme Camossato	Brazil	2:13.13	Q
5	6	2	Jeremias Pock	Germany	2:13.21	Q
6	5	5	Ivo Kroes	Netherlands	2:13.23	Q
6	6	6	Riku Yamaguchi	Japan	2:13.23	Q
8	4	3	Alessandro Fusco	Italy	2:13.50	Q
9	4	5	Adam Mak	Hong Kong	2:13.54	Q
10	5	7	Christian Ryan	Great Britain	2:14.14	Q
11	4	7	Liu Ching-hung	Chinese Taipei	2:14.40	Q
12	6	3	Dawid Wiekiera	Poland	2:14.46	Q
13	4	2	Matěj Zábojník	Czech Republic	2:14.82	Q
14	5	6	Kim Seung-hoon	South Korea	2:14.89	Q
15	4	1	Matthew Randle	South Africa	2:15.06	Q
16	6	7	Carl Aït Kaci	France	2:15.93	Q
17	6	4	Aleksei Sudarev	Individual Neutral Athletes	2:16.04	
18	5	8	Shaun Thomas	South Africa	2:16.18	
19	5	2	Brayden Taivassalo	Canada	2:16.20	
20	5	1	Aibat Myrzamuratov	Kazakhstan	2:16.45	
21	3	5	Kristaps Miķelsons	Latvia	2:16.58	
22	6	8	Finn Kemp	Luxembourg	2:16.87	
23	4	8	Jaš Berložnik	Slovenia	2:17.09	
24	3	4	Andrew Goh	Malaysia	2:17.84	
25	3	6	Gašper Pevec	Slovenia	2:18.28	
26	3	7	Phillip Osadský	Slovakia	2:18.66	
27	2	3	Lasha Mindiashvili	Georgia	2:18.87	
28	3	3	Collyn Gagne	Canada	2:19.32	
29	2	4	Maxwell Seidel	Switzerland	2:20.03	
30	6	1	Denis Șveț	Moldova	2:20.21	
31	3	8	Artjom Alteberg	Estonia	2:20.26	
32	2	6	Aleksandre Eradze	Georgia	2:20.98	
33	3	2	Roman Berkovich	Uzbekistan	2:21.27	
34	1	3	Said Hamidov	Azerbaijan	2:21.63	
35	2	7	Manikanta Lakshmana	India	2:21.80	
36	3	1	Artur Mironov	Kazakhstan	2:21.91	
37	2	5	Artur Norden	Estonia	2:23.59	
38	1	5	Derek Velasco	Ecuador	2:32.20	
39	2	2	Aditya Dubey	India	2:36.10	
40	2	1	Gunbilig Tsevegsguren	Mongolia	2:38.57	
41	1	2	Maksimilians Vegeris	Latvia	2:39.08	
42	1	6	Enzo Macedo	Argentina	2:44.77	
43	1	4	Namanya Ampaire	Uganda	2:44.92	
—	2	8	Daniel Caicedo	Ecuador	DNS	
—	4	4	Yuma Yoshida	Japan	DSQ	

=== Semifinals ===
The 16 advancing swimmers were split into two semifinal heats of 8 during the evening session. The swimmers recording the top 8 fastest times advanced to the final round.

Rank	Heat	Lane	Swimmer	Nation	Time	Notes
1	1	6	Alessandro Fusco	Italy	2:09.89	Q
2	2	4	Benjamin Delmar	United States	2:10.26	Q
3	2	2	Adam Mak	Hong Kong	2:10.61	Q
4	1	7	Dawid Wiekiera	Poland	2:11.15	Q
5	1	3	Riku Yamaguchi	Japan	2:11.59	Q
6	1	4	Joshua Bey	United States	2:11.63	Q
7	2	5	Lee Sang-hoon	South Korea	2:11.93	Q
7	2	6	Ivo Kroes	Netherlands	2:11.93	Q
9	2	3	Jeremias Pock	Germany	2:12.26	
10	1	5	Guilherme Camossato	Brazil	2:12.65	
11	1	2	Christian Ryan	Great Britain	2:13.51	
12	2	7	Liu Ching-hung	Chinese Taipei	2:13.57	
13	1	1	Kim Seung-hoon	South Korea	2:13.73	
14	2	1	Matěj Zábojník	Czech Republic	2:14.03	
15	1	8	Carl Aït Kaci	France	2:14.78	
16	2	8	Matthew Randle	South Africa	2:15.11	

=== Final ===
The fastest 8 swimmers competed in a single race to determine the gold, silver and bronze medalists.

Rank	Lane	Swimmer	Nation	Time	Notes
1st place, gold medalist(s)	5	Benjamin Delmar	United States	2:09.50	
2nd place, silver medalist(s)	3	Adam Mak	Hong Kong	2:10.53	
3rd place, bronze medalist(s)	6	Dawid Wiekiera	Poland	2:10.54	
4	4	Alessandro Fusco	Italy	2:10.92	
5	8	Ivo Kroes	Netherlands	2:11.69	
6	1	Lee Sang-hoon	South Korea	2:12.17	
7	2	Riku Yamaguchi	Japan	2:12.28	
—	7	Joshua Bey	United States	DSQ	
