= Fencing at the 2025 Summer World University Games – Women's individual sabre =

Women's individual sabre at the 2025 Summer World University Games
- Venue: Messe Essen
- Location: Essen
- Dates: 19 July
- Competitors: 55 from 23 nations

Medalists
gold medal	Jeon Ha-young	South Korea
silver medal	Anna Spiesz	Hungary
bronze medal	Summer Sit	Hong Kong
bronze medal	Chirika Takahashi	Japan

The women's individual sabre at the 2025 Summer World University Games in Rhine-Ruhr, Germany was held 19 July 2025. The gold medal was won by Jeon Ha-young from South Korea. The silver medal went to Anna Spiesz from Hungary. The two bronze medals were awarded to Summer Sit from Hong Kong and Chirika Takahashi from Japan, as both athletes finished in third place after losing their respective semifinal matches.

== Pool Results ==
55 fencers were divided into small groups to compete in a round-robin format, with matches played to 5 touches. Results from these pools determined the seeding for the next round.

Qualified for Table of 32
Qualified for Table of 64

=== Pool 1 ===
#	Seed	Athlete	1	2	3	4	5	6	7	V#	M#	Ind.	TG	TR	Diff.	RP
1	17	Kokona Kikuchi (JPN)		V_{5}	V_{5}	D_{2}	D_{4}	V_{5}	D_{4}	3	6	0.50	25	21	4	4
2	48	Ahad Bin Muammar (KSA)	D_{2}		D_{0}	D_{0}	D_{0}	D_{4}	D_{2}	0	6	0.00	8	30	-22	7
3	34	Emese Domonkos (HUN)	D_{1}	V_{5}		V_{5}	V_{5}	V_{5}	V_{5}	5	6	0.83	26	15	11	2
4	1	Jeon Ha-young (KOR)	V_{5}	V_{5}	D_{3}		V_{5}	V_{5}	V_{5}	5	6	0.83	28	9	19	1
5	33	Nil Güngör (TUR)	V_{5}	V_{5}	D_{1}	D_{0}		V_{5}	V_{5}	4	6	0.67	21	16	5	3
6	55	Narita Pen (CAM)	D_{3}	V_{5}	D_{2}	D_{0}	D_{0}		D_{0}	1	6	0.17	10	29	-19	6
7	16	Julia Cieślar (POL)	V_{5}	V_{5}	D_{4}	D_{2}	D_{2}	V_{5}		3	6	0.50	23	21	2	5

=== Pool 2 ===
#	Seed	Athlete	1	2	3	4	5	6	7	V#	M#	Ind.	TG	TR	Diff.	RP
1	15	Benedetta Fusetti (ITA)		V_{5}	D_{4}	V_{5}	V_{5}	V_{5}	V_{5}	5	6	0.83	29	19	10	1
2	31	Klaudia Malgrem (POL)	D_{3}		D_{3}	V_{5}	D_{2}	D_{2}	V_{5}	2	6	0.33	20	25	-5	5
3	18	Kíra Keszei (HUN)	V_{5}	V_{5}		D_{2}	D_{2}	V_{5}	V_{5}	4	6	0.67	24	19	5	2
4	2	Choi Se-bin (KOR)	D_{4}	D_{4}	V_{5}		D_{4}	V_{5}	V_{5}	3	6	0.50	27	21	6	3
5	51	Chloe Fox-Gitomer (USA)	D_{3}	V_{5}	V_{5}	V_{5}		D_{2}	D_{2}	3	6	0.50	22	23	-1	4
6	35	Karolína Bechyňová (CZE)	D_{4}	V_{5}	D_{1}	D_{1}	V_{5}		D_{2}	2	6	0.33	18	24	-6	6
7	47	Adema Serikbay (KAZ)	D_{0}	D_{1}	D_{1}	D_{3}	V_{5}	V_{5}		2	6	0.33	15	24	-9	7

=== Pool 3 ===
#	Seed	Athlete	1	2	3	4	5	6	7	V#	M#	Ind.	TG	TR	Diff.	RP
1	30	Lorraine Tang (AUS)		D_{4}	D_{1}	D_{3}	D_{1}	D_{3}	D_{4}	0	6	0.00	16	30	-14	7
2	14	Laren Leung (HKG)	V_{5}		V_{5}	V_{5}	D_{2}	V_{5}	V_{5}	5	6	0.83	27	17	10	2
3	52	Jagmeet Kaur (IND)	V_{5}	D_{4}		D_{2}	D_{2}	D_{2}	V_{5}	2	6	0.33	20	24	-4	4
4	3	Nisanur Erbil (TUR)	V_{5}	D_{1}	V_{5}		V_{5}	V_{5}	V_{5}	5	6	0.83	26	18	8	3
5	19	Chirika Takahashi (JPN)	V_{5}	V_{5}	V_{5}	D_{3}		V_{5}	V_{5}	5	6	0.83	28	15	13	1
6	32	Zuzanna Porada (POL)	V_{5}	D_{1}	V_{5}	D_{3}	D_{3}		D_{0}	2	6	0.33	17	25	-8	6
7	46	Polina Ko (KAZ)	V_{5}	D_{2}	D_{3}	D_{2}	D_{2}	V_{5}		2	6	0.33	19	24	-5	5

=== Pool 4 ===
#	Seed	Athlete	1	2	3	4	5	6	7	V#	M#	Ind.	TG	TR	Diff.	RP
1	20	María Ventura (ESP)		D_{2}	V_{5}	V_{5}	V_{5}	V_{5}	V_{5}	5	6	0.83	27	14	13	2
2	4	Kim Jeong-mi (KOR)	V_{5}		V_{5}	D_{1}	V_{5}	V_{5}	V_{5}	5	6	0.83	26	12	14	1
3	29	Daria Skonieczna (POL)	D_{3}	D_{1}		V_{5}	D_{2}	D_{4}	V_{5}	2	6	0.33	20	25	-5	5
4	13	Chu Wing Kiu (HKG)	D_{1}	V_{5}	D_{3}		V_{5}	V_{5}	V_{5}	4	6	0.67	24	19	5	3
5	54	Ashley Muñoz (MEX)	D_{1}	D_{1}	V_{5}	D_{0}		D_{4}	D_{3}	1	6	0.17	14	27	-13	7
6	45	Thhivya Siva Kumar (SGP)	D_{0}	D_{1}	V_{5}	D_{4}	V_{5}		V_{5}	3	6	0.50	20	26	-6	4
7	36	Viktória Pápai (HUN)	D_{4}	D_{2}	D_{2}	D_{4}	V_{5}	D_{3}		1	6	0.17	20	28	-8	6

=== Pool 5 ===
#	Seed	Athlete	1	2	3	4	5	6	7	V#	M#	Ind.	TG	TR	Diff.	RP
1	44	Zara Fearns (USA)		D_{1}	D_{4}	D_{3}	V_{5}	D_{0}	D_{0}	1	6	0.17	13	28	-15	6
2	37	Kanako Itahashi (JPN)	V_{5}		D_{2}	V_{5}	V_{5}	D_{2}	D_{2}	3	6	0.50	21	22	-1	5
3	12	Claudia Rotili (ITA)	V_{5}	V_{5}		V_{5}	V_{5}	D_{1}	V_{5}	5	6	0.83	26	18	8	2
4	28	Lena Stemper (GER)	V_{5}	D_{4}	D_{4}		V_{5}	D_{2}	V_{5}	3	6	0.50	25	24	1	4
5	50	María Castaño (ESP)	D_{3}	D_{2}	D_{0}	D_{2}		D_{0}	D_{0}	0	6	0.00	7	30	-23	7
6	5	Anna Spiesz (HUN)	V_{5}	V_{5}	V_{5}	V_{5}	V_{5}		V_{5}	6	6	1.00	30	9	21	1
7	21	Jolien Corteyn (BEL)	V_{5}	V_{5}	D_{3}	D_{4}	V_{5}	D_{4}		3	6	0.50	26	17	9	3

=== Pool 6 ===
#	Seed	Athlete	1	2	3	4	5	6	7	V#	M#	Ind.	TG	TR	Diff.	RP
1	40	Marisa Kurzawa (GER)		V_{5}	V_{5}	D_{2}	D_{3}	V_{5}	D_{2}	3	6	0.50	22	22	0	5
2	6	Summer Sit (HKG)	D_{3}		V_{5}	D_{2}	V_{5}	V_{5}	D_{1}	3	6	0.50	21	19	2	3
3	11	Kelly Lusinier (FRA)	D_{2}	D_{1}		V_{5}	V_{5}	V_{5}	V_{5}	4	6	0.67	23	25	-2	2
4	49	Bethany Brierley (GBR)	V_{5}	V_{5}	D_{4}		D_{2}	D_{4}	D_{1}	2	6	0.33	21	24	-3	6
5	38	Seon Eun-bi (KOR)	V_{5}	D_{0}	D_{4}	V_{5}		V_{5}	D_{3}	3	6	0.50	22	21	1	4
6	27	Mitsuki Suto (JPN)	D_{2}	D_{3}	D_{4}	V_{5}	D_{1}		V_{5}	2	6	0.33	20	28	-8	7
7	22	Shreya Gupta (IND)	V_{5}	V_{5}	D_{3}	V_{5}	V_{5}	D_{4}		4	6	0.67	27	17	10	1

=== Pool 7 ===
#	Seed	Athlete	1	2	3	4	5	6	7	V#	M#	Ind.	TG	TR	Diff.	RP
1	53	Rishika Khajuria (IND)		D_{3}	D_{1}	V_{5}	D_{4}	D_{4}	V_{5}	2	6	0.33	22	26	-4	5
2	39	Kaisha Zhanybek (KAZ)	V_{5}		D_{1}	V_{5}	D_{1}	V_{5}	V_{5}	4	6	0.67	22	20	2	3
3	9	Michela Landi (ITA)	V_{5}	V_{5}		V_{5}	D_{1}	V_{5}	D_{3}	4	6	0.67	24	13	11	2
4	26	Christine Weber (GER)	D_{4}	D_{3}	D_{0}		D_{2}	V_{5}	D_{2}	1	6	0.17	16	27	-11	6
5	7	Lola Tranquille (FRA)	V_{5}	V_{5}	V_{5}	V_{5}		V_{5}	D_{3}	5	6	0.83	28	14	14	1
6	43	Franziska Tanzmeister (AUT)	V_{5}	D_{3}	D_{1}	D_{2}	D_{1}		D_{4}	1	6	0.17	16	29	-13	7
7	23	Itziar Gallardo (ESP)	D_{2}	D_{1}	V_{5}	V_{5}	V_{5}	V_{5}		4	6	0.67	23	22	1	4

=== Pool 8 ===
#	Seed	Athlete	1	2	3	4	5	6	V#	M#	Ind.	TG	TR	Diff.	RP
1	25	Marleen Buitenhuis (NED)		V_{5}	V_{5}	D_{3}	V_{5}	D_{4}	3	5	0.60	22	17	5	3
2	8	Alessia Di Carlo (ITA)	D_{4}		D_{3}	V_{5}	V_{5}	V_{5}	3	5	0.60	22	16	6	2
3	10	Mathilde Mouroux (FRA)	D_{3}	V_{5}		V_{5}	V_{5}	V_{5}	4	5	0.80	23	13	10	1
4	24	Victoria Graudins (GER)	V_{5}	D_{2}	D_{1}		D_{3}	V_{5}	2	5	0.40	16	21	-5	4
5	41	Aakhri (IND)	D_{0}	D_{1}	D_{1}	V_{5}		V_{5}	2	5	0.40	12	20	-8	5
6	42	Begüm Alkaya (TUR)	V_{5}	D_{3}	D_{3}	D_{3}	D_{2}		1	5	0.20	16	24	-8	6

== Results bracket ==
The top-ranked fencers advanced to a single-elimination bracket, where matches were played to 15 touches. A loss meant immediate elimination from the tournament. In line with official fencing regulations, losers of the semifinal matches did not compete against each other. Both automatically received bronze medals.

Table of 64
33	T Siva Kumar (SGP)	11
32	K Itahashi (JPN)	15
25	K Kikuchi (JPN)	15
39T	K Malgrem (POL)	9
37	R Khajuria (IND)	5
28	L Stemper (GER)	15
29	Seon Eb (KOR)	15
36	B Brierley (GBR)	8
35	Aakhri (IND)	15
30	M Kurzawa (GER)	14
27	S Sit (HKG)	15
38	J Kaur (IND)	5
39T	D Skonieczna (POL)	7
26	J Cieślar (POL)	15
31	C Fox-Gitomer (USA)	15
34	V Graudins (GER)	11

Table of 32
1	A Spiesz (HUN)	15
32	K Itahashi (JPN)	7
17	N Güngör (TUR)	12
15T	Chu WK (HKG)	15
9	L Leung (HKG)	12
24	Choi Sb (KOR)	15
25	K Kikuchi (JPN)	13
8	B Fusetti (ITA)	15
5	C Takahashi (JPN)	15
28	L Stemper (GER)	13
21	A Di Carlo (ITA)	15
12	M Mouroux (FRA)	10
13	M Landi (ITA)	12
20	K Lusinier (FRA)	15
29	Seon Eb (KOR)	7
4	Kim Jm (KOR)	15
3	L Tranquille (FRA)	15
35	Aakhri (IND)	10
19	I Gallardo (ESP)	15
14	S Gupta (IND)	8
10T	C Rotili (ITA)	15
22	M Buitenhuis (NED)	12
27	S Sit (HKG)	15
6	M Ventura (ESP)	7
7	E Domonkos (HUN)	15
26	J Cieślar (POL)	13
23	J Corteyn (BEL)	14
10T	N Erbil (TUR)	15
15T	K Keszei (HUN)	15
18	K Zhanybek (KAZ)	12
31	C Fox-Gitomer (USA)	11
2	Jeon Hy (KOR)	15

Table of 16
1	A Spiesz (HUN)	15
15T	Chu WK (HKG)	9
24	Choi Sb (KOR)	15
8	B Fusetti (ITA)	9
5	C Takahashi (JPN)	15
21	A Di Carlo (ITA)	13
20	K Lusinier (FRA)	15
4	Kim Jm (KOR)	14
3	L Tranquille (FRA)	15
19	I Gallardo (ESP)	12
10T	C Rotili (ITA)	10
27	S Sit (HKG)	15
7	E Domonkos (HUN)	6
10T	N Erbil (TUR)	15
15T	K Keszei (HUN)	8
2	Jeon Hy (KOR)	15

Quarterfinals
1	A Spiesz (HUN)	15
24	Choi Sb (KOR)	12
5	C Takahashi (JPN)	15
20	K Lusinier (FRA)	14
3	L Tranquille (FRA)	10
27	S Sit (HKG)	15
10T	N Erbil (TUR)	12
2	Jeon Hy (KOR)	15

Semifinals
1	A Spiesz (HUN)	15
5	C Takahashi (JPN)	13
27	S Sit (HKG)	12
2	Jeon Hy (KOR)	15

Final
1	A Spiesz (HUN)	7
2	Jeon Hy (KOR)	15
