= Diving at the 2025 Summer World University Games – Women's team classification =

Women's team classification at the 2025 Summer World University Games
- Venue: Schwimm- und Sprunghalle im Europasportpark
- Location: Berlin
- Dates: 17–23 July
- Nations: 14

Medalists
gold medal	China
silver medal	United States
bronze medal	South Korea

The women's team classification at the 2025 Summer World University Games in Rhine-Ruhr, Germany was held from 17 to 23 July 2025. The gold medal was won by China, the silver medal by United States and the bronze medal by South Korea.

== Schedule ==
All times are Central European Time (UTC+1)

Date	Time	Round
17 July 2025	14:45	Mixed Synchronised 3m Springboard
17 July 2025	16:30	Women's Synchronised 10m Platform
18 July 2025	14:25	Women's Synchronised 3m Springboard
19 July 2025	13:50	Mixed Team (3m / 10m)
20 July 2025	16:10	Women's 10m Platform
21 July 2025	15:30	Women's 3m Springboard
23 July 2025	11:30	Women's 1m Springboard
23 July 2025	15:20	Mixed Synchronised 10m Platform

== Results ==
14 nations entered the event.

Rank	Name	1 m		3 m		Platform		3m Synchro	10m Synchro	3m Synchro Mixed 50%	10m Synchro Mixed 50%	Mixed Team 50%	Total
Rank	Name	#1	#2	#1	#2	#1	#2	3m Synchro	10m Synchro	3m Synchro Mixed 50%	10m Synchro Mixed 50%	Mixed Team 50%	Total
1st place, gold medalist(s)	China	272.50	267.85	332.00	319.70	337.00	324.75	294.90	330.18	137.70	170.97	214.55	3002.10
2nd place, silver medalist(s)	United States	246.25	223.45	262.50	245.90	298.65	259.40	265.98	256.62	132.82	145.68	196.75	2534.00
3rd place, bronze medalist(s)	South Korea	229.85	221.70	265.50	217.55	248.10	237.20	251.73	232.62	132.21	133.41	200.05	2369.92
4	Germany			301.60	294.30	347.15	270.60	263.10	294.60	144.10		218.55	2134.01
5	Japan	197.95	182.10	274.40	190.50	253.30	247.05	230.52	139.20	119.16	116.59	132.03	2082.80
6	Brazil	217.20	203.00	205.40	178.70	198.10		216.24				150.60	1369.24
7	Individual Neutral Athletes	217.65		207.80	126.20	241.60		224.31		132.62			1150.18
8	South Africa	218.85	183.45	230.30	212.05			208.74					1053.39
9	Italy	233.70	231.20	191.05	160.00			220.56					1036.51
10	Australia	227.85		229.60		234.80			251.58				943.83
11	Hungary	203.95		252.30									456.25
12	Netherlands	207.70		241.80									449.50
13	Norway							201.15	205.77				406.92
14	Georgia	176.65						75.60					252.25
