= Diving at the 2025 Summer World University Games =

International diving championship event

- Venue: Europe SportPark Aquatics Centre
- Dates: 17–23 July 2025
- Nations: 19

Diving took place at the 2025 Summer World University Games from 17 to 23 July 2025 at the Europe SportPark Aquatics Centre in Berlin, Germany.

== Participant nations/NUSFs ==
19 National University Sporting Federations (NUSF)s participated in this event.

1. Individual Neutral Athletes
2. Australia
3. Brazil
4. China
5. Great Britain
6. Germany
7. Georgia
8. Hungary
9. Italy
10. Japan
11. South Korea
12. Lithuania
13. Netherlands
14. Norway
15. South Africa
16. Switzerland
17. Ukraine
18. United States
19. Uzbekistan

== Medal table ==
* Host nation (Germany)

Rank	Nation	Gold	Silver	Bronze	Total
1	China	12	8	0	20
2	Germany*	3	2	4	9
3	United States	0	4	5	9
4	South Korea	0	1	6	7
Totals (4 entries)		15	15	15	45

== Medal summary ==
=== Men's events ===
Event	Gold	Silver	Bronze
1 m springboard	Zhang Wenao; China	Hu Yukang; China	Tim Axer; Germany
3 m springboard	Moritz Wesemann; Germany	Hu Yukang; China	Luke Sitz; United States
10 m platform	Zheng Junzhi; China	Mo Yonghua; China	Kim Yeong-taek; South Korea
Synchronized 3 m springboard	China; Zhang Wenao; Hu Yukang	United States; Joshua Sollenberger; Luke Sitz	South Korea; Kim Ji-wook; Kim Yeong-taek
Synchronized 10 m platform	China; Zheng Junzhi; Mo Yonghua	Germany; Luis Ávila Sanchez; Jaden Eikermann	South Korea; Kim Yeong-taek; Kim Ji-wook
Team classification	China; Fan Yi; Hu Yukang; Zheng Junzhi; Mo Yonghua; Mo Zhengxiong; Zhang Wenao	South Korea; Kim Ji-wook; Kim Yeong-ho; Kim Yeong-taek; Choi Ga-ngin	United States; Maxwell Miller; Luke Sitz; Maxwell Weinrich; Andrew Bennett; Kaden Springfield; Dashiell Glasberg; Holden Higbie; Jacob Jones; Joshua Sollenberger

=== Women's events ===
Event	Gold	Silver	Bronze
1 m springboard	Ouyang Yu; China	Wang Yi; China	Avery Giese; United States
3 m springboard	Wang Weiying; China	Qu Zhixin; China	Lena Hentschel; Germany
10 m platform	Lu Wei; China	Wang Weiying; China	Pauline Pfeif; Germany
Synchronized 3 m springboard	China; Ouyang Yu; Wang Weiying	United States; Eliana Joyce; Lanie Gutch	Germany; Lena Hentschel; Jette Müller
Synchronized 10 m platform	China; He Yanwei; Lu Wei	Germany; Pauline Pfeif; Carolina Coordes	United States; Lanie Gutch; Kayleigh Clark
Team classification	China; Mei Yingxin; He Yanwei; Lu Wei; Wang Weiying; Ouyang Yu; Qu Zhixin; Wang Yi	United States; Eliana Joyce; Lanie Gutch; Kayleigh Clark; Taylor Fox; Sophia Mcafee; Avery Giese; Katerina Hoffman; Violet Williamson	South Korea; Oh Soo-yeon; Kim Seo-yeon; Kim Seung-hyun; Choi Yu-jeong; Kim Na-hyun; Kim Ye-lim

=== Mixed ===
Event	Gold	Silver	Bronze
Synchronized 3 m springboard	Germany; Luis Ávila Sanchez; Lena Hentschel	China; Fan Yi; Mei Yingxin	United States; Maxwell Miller; Eliana Joyce
Synchronized 10 m platform	China; Zheng Junzhi; Wang Weiying	United States; Sophia McAfee; Kaden Springfield	South Korea; Kim Na-hyun; Kim Yeong-taek
Mixed team	Germany; Moritz Wesemann; Jaden Eikermann; Jette Müller; Pauline Pfeif	China; Mo Zhengxiong; Mo Yonghua; Qu Zhixin; He Yanwei	South Korea; Kim Ji-wook; Kim Yeong-taek; Oh Soo-yeon; Kim Na-hyun
