= Badminton at the 2025 Summer World University Games =

- Venue: Westenergie Sporthalle
- Dates: 17–26 July 2025
- Competitors: 195 from 21 nations

Badminton was contested at the 2025 Summer World University Games from 17 to 26 July 2025 at the Westenergie Sporthalle in Mülheim, Germany. The tournament comprised six events: men's and women's singles, men's and women's doubles, mixed doubles, and a mixed team event.

== Medal summary ==
=== Medal table ===
* Host nation (Germany)

Rank	Nation	Gold	Silver	Bronze	Total
1	Chinese Taipei	2	3	1	6
2	China	2	1	4	7
3	Thailand	1	1	1	3
4	South Korea	1	0	1	2
5	France	0	1	0	1
6	Japan	0	0	2	2
7	India	0	0	1	1
7	Malaysia	0	0	1	1
7	United States	0	0	1	1
Totals (9 entries)		6	6	12	24

Source: rhineruhr2025.com

=== Medal events ===
Event	Gold	Silver	Bronze
Men's singles	Ting Yen-chen; Chinese Taipei	Enogat Roy; France	Zhou Xinyu; China
Men's singles	Ting Yen-chen; Chinese Taipei	Enogat Roy; France	Rei Miyashita; Japan
Women's singles	Thamonwan Nithiittikrai; Thailand	Tidapron Kleebyeesun; Thailand	Wong Ling Ching; Malaysia
Women's singles	Thamonwan Nithiittikrai; Thailand	Tidapron Kleebyeesun; Thailand	Ella Lin; United States
Men's doubles	Jin Yong; Lee Jong-min; South Korea	Cui Hechen; Peng Jianqin; China	Peeratchai Sukphun; Pakkapon Teeraratsakul; Thailand
Men's doubles	Jin Yong; Lee Jong-min; South Korea	Cui Hechen; Peng Jianqin; China	Liao Pinyi; Zhang Lejian; China
Women's doubles	Li Qian; Wang Yiduo; China	Jheng Yu-chieh; Sung Yu-hsuan; Chinese Taipei	Liu Jiayue; Tang Ruizhi; China
Women's doubles	Li Qian; Wang Yiduo; China	Jheng Yu-chieh; Sung Yu-hsuan; Chinese Taipei	Sumire Nakade; Yumi Tanabe; Japan
Mixed doubles	Wu Hsuan-yi; Yang Chu-yun; Chinese Taipei	Chen Cheng-kuan; Hsu Yin-hui; Chinese Taipei	Liao Pinyi; Li Qian; China
Mixed doubles	Wu Hsuan-yi; Yang Chu-yun; Chinese Taipei	Chen Cheng-kuan; Hsu Yin-hui; Chinese Taipei	Lin Yu-chieh; Jheng Yu-chieh; Chinese Taipei
Mixed team	China; Cui Hechen; Dai Qinyi; Li Qian; Liao Pinyi; Liu Jiayue; Peng Jianqin; Tang Ruizhi; Wang Yiduo; Wang Zijun; Yuan Anqi; Zhang Lejian; Zhou Xinyu	Chinese Taipei; Chen Cheng-kuan; Chen Zhi-ray; Hsu Yin-hui; Huang Ching-ping; Jheng Yu-chieh; Lin Yu-chieh; Su Li-yang; Sung Yu-hsuan; Ting Yen-chen; Wang Pei-yu; Wu Hsuan-yi; Yang Chu-yun	India; Saneeth Dayanand; Sathish Karunakaran; Vaishnavi Khadkekar; Tasnim Mir; Devika Sihag; Varshini Viswanath Sri
Mixed team	China; Cui Hechen; Dai Qinyi; Li Qian; Liao Pinyi; Liu Jiayue; Peng Jianqin; Tang Ruizhi; Wang Yiduo; Wang Zijun; Yuan Anqi; Zhang Lejian; Zhou Xinyu	Chinese Taipei; Chen Cheng-kuan; Chen Zhi-ray; Hsu Yin-hui; Huang Ching-ping; Jheng Yu-chieh; Lin Yu-chieh; Su Li-yang; Sung Yu-hsuan; Ting Yen-chen; Wang Pei-yu; Wu Hsuan-yi; Yang Chu-yun	South Korea; Choi Hyo-won; Choi Ji-hoon; Jin Yong; Kang Geon-hui; Kim Chae-jung; Kim Yun-ju; Lee Chae-eun; Lee Hye-won; Lee Jong-min; Lee So-yul; Park Seung-min; Park Si-hyun

== Participating nations ==
A total of 195 athletes from 21 nations are competing in the badminton tournament of the 2025 Summer World University Games.

- Australia (7)
- Azerbaijan (4)
- Brazil (2)
- Canada (12)
- China (12)
- Chinese Taipei (12)
- France (7)
- Germany (9)
- Hong Kong (9)
- Hungary (8)
- India (6)
- Japan (12)
- Macau (6)
- Malaysia (12)
- Netherlands (6)
- Poland (9)
- South Korea (12)
- Singapore (12)
- Spain (12)
- Thailand (12)
- Ukraine (4)
- United States (12)
