= Ireland at the 2025 Summer World University Games =

- Flag of Ireland
- IOC code: IRL
- National federation: Student Sport Ireland

in Rhine-Ruhr, Germany 16 July 2025 – 27 July 2025
- Competitors: 22 in 6 sports
- Flag bearers: Conor Gannon (tennis); Ammar Elamin (tennis)
- Medals Ranked 36th: Gold 1 Silver 1 Bronze 0 Total 2

Summer World University Games appearances
- 1959; 1961; 1963; 1965; 1967; 1970; 1973; 1975; 1977; 1979; 1981; 1983; 1985; 1987; 1989; 1991; 1993; 1995; 1997; 1999; 2001; 2003; 2005; 2007; 2009; 2011; 2013; 2015; 2017; 2019; 2021; 2025; 2027

Ireland competed at the 2025 Summer World University Games in Rhine-Ruhr, Germany held from 16 to 27 July 2025. Ireland was represented by 22 athletes and took thirty-sixth place in the medal table with two medals. Conor Gannon (tennis) and Ammar Elamin (tennis) were the flag bearers at the opening ceremony.

== Medal summary ==
=== Medal by sports ===
Rank	Sports	Gold	Silver	Bronze	Total
1	Athletics	1	1	0	2
Totals (1 entries)		1	1	0	2

Source: rhineruhr2025.com

=== Medalists ===
Medal	Name	Sport	Event	Date
Gold	Kate O'Connor	Athletics	Women's heptathlon	24 July
Silver	Nicola Tuthill	Athletics	Women's hammer throw	27 July

== Archery ==
=== Athletes ===
- Rowanna Hanlon
- Rogan Cunningham
- Sam Delaney
- Fionn Roche

== Athletics ==
=== Track ===
Athlete	Event	Heat		Semifinal		Final	
Athlete	Event	Result	Rank	Result	Rank	Result	Rank
Bori Akinola	Men's 100 m	10.49	10 Q	10.49	9	Did not advance	
Jack Raftery	Men's 400m	46.39	2 Q	46.07	6 Q	45.69	4
Oisin Lane	Men's 20km Walk	–				1:23:06	11
Lauren Roy	Women's 200m	23.57	8 Q	24.07	11	Did not advance	
Laura Nicholson	Women's 1500m	4:20.72	12 Q	–		4:22.32	8
Ava O'Connor	Women's 3000m Steeplechase	9:50.21	1 Q	–		9:51.07	9

=== Field ===
Athlete	Event	Qualification		Final	
Athlete	Event	Distance	Position	Distance	Position
Nicola Tuthill	Women's Hammer Throw	69.57	2 Q	69.98	2nd place, silver medalist(s)

=== Combined Events - Women's Heptathlon ===
Athlete	Event	100H	HJ	SP	200 m	LJ	JT	800 m	Final	Rank
Kate O'Connor	Result	13.89 SB	1.83	13.76	24.33 PB	6.15	51.87 SB	2:10.46 PB	6487 NR	1st place, gold medalist(s)
Kate O'Connor	Points	994	1016	778	949	896	896	958	6487 NR	1st place, gold medalist(s)

== Swimming ==
Athlete	Event	Heat		Semifinal		Final	
Athlete	Event	Time	Rank	Time	Rank	Time	Rank
Charlotte Cullen	Women's 50m Backstroke	29.38	16 Q	29.28	13	Did Not Advance	
Charlotte Cullen	Women's 100m Backstroke	1:02.37	19	Did not advance			
Charlotte Cullen	Women's 200m Backstroke	2:17.28	20	Did not advance			

== Tennis ==
Athlete	Event	Round of 64	Round of 32	Round of 16	Quarterfinals	Semifinals	Final / BM	
Athlete	Event	Opposition Score	Opposition Score	Opposition Score	Opposition Score	Opposition Score	Opposition Score	Rank
Ammar Elamin	Singles	Campoverde (ECU) W 6–0, 6–2	Xiao (CHN) W 6–3, 3–6, 6–3	Tammaro (ITA) W 6–3, 7–5	Connel (GBR) L 7–6, 6–2	Did Not Advance		5
Conor Gannon	Singles	Lung Ng (HKG) W 6–3, 7–5	Svajda (USA) L 6–1, 7–6	Did not advance				17
Ammar Elamin Conor Gannon	Doubles	–	Alkaya / Duran (TUR) L 2–6, 7–5, [8–10]	Did not advance				17
