= Table tennis at the 2025 Summer World University Games =

International table tennis tournament

- Venue: Messe Essen Halle 1
- Dates: 17–24 July 2025
- Nations: 53

Table tennis took place at the 2025 Summer World University Games from 17 to 24 July 2025 at the Messe Essen in Essen, Germany.

== Medal table ==
* Host nation (Germany)

Rank	Nation	Gold	Silver	Bronze	Total
1	China	2	4	3	9
2	Japan	2	1	1	4
3	Chinese Taipei	1	1	2	4
–	Individual Neutral Athletes	1	1	0	2
4	Hong Kong	1	0	3	4
5	Romania	0	0	2	2
6	France	0	0	1	1
6	Germany*	0	0	1	1
6	South Korea	0	0	1	1
Totals (8 entries)		7	7	14	28

== Medalists ==
Event	Gold	Silver	Bronze
Men's singles	Vladimir Sidorenko; Individual Neutral Athletes	Maksim Grebnev; Individual Neutral Athletes	Eduard Ionescu; Romania
Men's singles	Vladimir Sidorenko; Individual Neutral Athletes	Maksim Grebnev; Individual Neutral Athletes	Sun Zheng; China
Women's singles	Zhao Shang; China	Huang Yu-jie; Chinese Taipei	Ng Wing Lam; Hong Kong
Women's singles	Zhao Shang; China	Huang Yu-jie; Chinese Taipei	Wang Xiaotong; China
Men's doubles	Hong Kong; Baldwin Chan; Yiu Kwan To	Japan; Shunsuke Okano; Yuma Tanigaki	South Korea; Cho Dae-seong; Yun Chang-min
Men's doubles	Hong Kong; Baldwin Chan; Yiu Kwan To	Japan; Shunsuke Okano; Yuma Tanigaki	Romania; Eduard Ionescu; Darius Movileanu
Women's doubles	China; Han Feier; Wang Xiaotong	China; Yang Yiyun; Zhao Shang	Chinese Taipei; Chien Tung-chuan; Tsai Yun-en
Women's doubles	China; Han Feier; Wang Xiaotong	China; Yang Yiyun; Zhao Shang	France; Isa Cok; Camille Lutz
Mixed doubles	Japan; Shunsuke Okano; Kyoka Idesawa	China; Zeng Beixun; Han Feier	Hong Kong; Baldwin Chan; Wong Hoi Tung
Mixed doubles	Japan; Shunsuke Okano; Kyoka Idesawa	China; Zeng Beixun; Han Feier	China; Chen Junsong; Wang Xiaotong
Men's team	Chinese Taipei; Chang Ping-cheng; Feng Yi-hsin; Huang Yan-cheng; Kao Cheng-jui	China; Ao Hualei; Chen Junsong; Sun Zheng; Zeng Beixun	Germany; Matthias Danzer; Kirill Fadeev; Timotius Köchling; Benno Oehme
Men's team	Chinese Taipei; Chang Ping-cheng; Feng Yi-hsin; Huang Yan-cheng; Kao Cheng-jui	China; Ao Hualei; Chen Junsong; Sun Zheng; Zeng Beixun	Japan; Shunsuke Okano; Yuma Tanigaki; Kanta Tokuda; Jo Yokotani
Women's team	Japan; Sakura Aoi; Mana Asada; Kyoka Idesawa; Kotomi Omoda	China; Han Feier; Wang Xiaotong; Yang Yiyun; Zhao Shang	Chinese Taipei; Cheng Pu-syuan; Chien Tung-chuan; Huang Yu-jie; Tsai Yun-en
Women's team	Japan; Sakura Aoi; Mana Asada; Kyoka Idesawa; Kotomi Omoda	China; Han Feier; Wang Xiaotong; Yang Yiyun; Zhao Shang	Hong Kong; Kong Tsz Lam; Lee Hoi Man; Ng Wing Lam; Wong Hoi Tung
