= Tennis at the 2025 Summer World University Games =

International tennis tournament

- Venue: Essen Tennis Club
- Dates: 17–26 July 2025
- Nations: 52

Tennis will take place at the 2025 Summer World University Games from 17 to 26 July 2025 at the Essen Tennis Club in Essen, Germany.

== Medal table ==
* Host nation (Germany)

Rank	Nation	Gold	Silver	Bronze	Total
1	Japan	5	0	0	5
–	Individual Neutral Athletes	1	1	1	3
2	Slovakia	1	1	0	2
3	Great Britain	0	2	1	3
4	Kenya	0	1	1	2
4	Turkey	0	1	1	2
6	Chinese Taipei	0	1	0	1
7	Belgium	0	0	1	1
7	China	0	0	1	1
7	Czech Republic	0	0	1	1
7	Germany*	0	0	1	1
7	India	0	0	1	1
7	Italy	0	0	1	1
7	Portugal	0	0	1	1
7	Sweden	0	0	1	1
Totals (14 entries)		7	7	12	26

== Medalists ==
Event	Gold	Silver	Bronze
Men's singles	Jay Dylan Hara Friend; Japan	Toby Samuel; Great Britain	Alessio Vasquez; Germany
Men's singles	Jay Dylan Hara Friend; Japan	Toby Samuel; Great Britain	James Connel; Great Britain
Women's singles	Eszter Méri; Slovakia	Alevtina Ibragimova; Individual Neutral Athletes	Jana Otzipka; Belgium
Women's singles	Eszter Méri; Slovakia	Alevtina Ibragimova; Individual Neutral Athletes	Vaishnavi Adkar; India
Men's doubles	Individual Neutral Athletes (AIN); Egor Agafonov; Ilia Simakin	Turkey (TUR); Mert Alkaya; Tuncay Duran	Italy (ITA); Fabio De Michele; Mariano Tammaro
Men's doubles	Individual Neutral Athletes (AIN); Egor Agafonov; Ilia Simakin	Turkey (TUR); Mert Alkaya; Tuncay Duran	Sweden (SWE); John Gabelic; Nikola Slavic
Women's doubles	Japan (JPN); Ange Oby Kajuru; Kanon Yamaguchi	Chinese Taipei (TPE); Li Yu-yun; Lin Fang-an	Individual Neutral Athletes (AIN); Alevtina Ibragimova; Ksenia Zaytseva
Women's doubles	Japan (JPN); Ange Oby Kajuru; Kanon Yamaguchi	Chinese Taipei (TPE); Li Yu-yun; Lin Fang-an	China (CHN); Li Zongyu; Yao Xinxin
Mixed doubles	Japan (JPN); Natsuki Yoshimoto; Jay Dylan Hara Friend	Kenya (KEN); Angella Okutoyi; Kael Shah	Czech Republic (CZE); Karolína Kubáňová; Jan Jermář
Mixed doubles	Japan (JPN); Natsuki Yoshimoto; Jay Dylan Hara Friend	Kenya (KEN); Angella Okutoyi; Kael Shah	Portugal (POR); Maria Libório Garcia; Pedro Araújo
Men's team event	Japan (JPN)	Great Britain (GBR)	Turkey (TUR)
Women's team event	Japan (JPN)	Slovakia (SVK)	Kenya (KEN)
