= Thailand at the 2025 Summer World University Games =

- Flag of Thailand
- IOC code: THA
- National federation: University Sports Board of Thailand

in Rhine-Ruhr, Germany 16 July 2025 – 27 July 2025
- Competitors: 62 in 9 sports
- Medals Ranked 21st: Gold 2 Silver 4 Bronze 4 Total 10

Summer World University Games appearances
- 1985; 1987; 1989; 1991; 1993; 1995; 1997; 1999; 2001; 2003; 2005; 2007; 2009; 2011; 2013; 2015; 2017; 2019; 2021; 2025; 2027

Thailand competed at the 2025 Summer World University Games in Rhine-Ruhr, Germany held from 16 to 27 July 2025. Thailand was represented by 62 athletes and took twenty-first place in the medal table with 10 medals.

== Medal summary ==
=== Medal by sports ===
Rank	Sports	Gold	Silver	Bronze	Total
1	Taekwondo	1	2	3	6
2	Badminton	1	1	1	3
3	Athletics	0	1	0	1
Totals (3 entries)		2	4	4	10

Source: rhineruhr2025.com

=== Medalists ===
Medal	Name	Sport	Event	Date
Gold	Banlung Tubtimdang	Taekwondo	Men -68kg	19 July
Gold	Thamonwan Nithiittikrai	Badminton	Women's singles	26 July
Silver	Sirawit Mahamad	Taekwondo	Men -58kg	20 July
Silver	Puripol Boonson	Athletics	Men's 100m	22 July
Silver	Chutikan Jongkolrattanawattana	Taekwondo	Women -53kg	23 July
Silver	Tidapron Kleebyeesun	Badminton	Women's singles	26 July
Bronze	Kamonchanok Seeken	Taekwondo	Women -49kg	20 July
Bronze	Sasikarn Tongchan	Taekwondo	Women -62kg	21 July
Bronze	Piyachutrutai Chareewan; Sasikarn Tongchan; Orawan Ratsameprapa	Taekwondo	Women's team kyorugi	23 July
Bronze	Peeratchai Sukphun; Pakkapon Teeraratsakul	Badminton	Men's doubles	26 July
