= Mongolia at the 2025 Summer World University Games =

- Flag of Mongolia
- IOC code: MGL
- National federation: Mongolian Students’ Sports Federation

in Rhine-Ruhr, Germany 16 July 2025 – 27 July 2025
- Flag bearer: Chinguun Uuganbayar (3x3 basketball)
- Medals Ranked 55th: Gold 0 Silver 0 Bronze 1 Total 1

Summer World University Games appearances
- 1959; 1961; 1963; 1965; 1967; 1970; 1973; 1975; 1977; 1979; 1981; 1983; 1985; 1987; 1989; 1991; 1993; 1995; 1997; 1999; 2001; 2003; 2005; 2007; 2009; 2011; 2013; 2015; 2017; 2019; 2021; 2025; 2027

Mongolia competed at the 2025 Summer World University Games in Rhine-Ruhr, Germany held from 16 to 27 July 2025. Mongolia took fifty-fifth place in the medal table with one medal. Chinguun Uuganbayar (3x3 basketball) was a flag bearer at the opening ceremony.

== Medal summary ==
=== Medal by sports ===
Rank	Sports	Gold	Silver	Bronze	Total
1	Judo	0	0	1	1
Totals (1 entries)		0	0	1	1

Source: rhineruhr2025.com

=== Medalists ===
Medal	Name	Sport	Event	Date
Bronze	Tüvshintöriin Tümenjargal	Judo	Men -60 kg	23 July
