= Romania at the 2025 Summer World University Games =

- Flag of Romania
- IOC code: ROU
- National federation: Romanian Schools and Universities Sport Federation

in Rhine-Ruhr, Germany 16 July 2025 – 27 July 2025
- Competitors: 64 in 9 sports
- Medals Ranked 52nd: Gold 0 Silver 0 Bronze 4 Total 4

Summer World University Games appearances
- 1959; 1961; 1963; 1965; 1967; 1970; 1973; 1975; 1977; 1979; 1981; 1983; 1985; 1987; 1989; 1991; 1993; 1995; 1997; 1999; 2001; 2003; 2005; 2007; 2009; 2011; 2013; 2015; 2017; 2019; 2021; 2025; 2027

Romania competed at the 2025 Summer World University Games in Rhine-Ruhr, Germany held from 16 to 27 July 2025. Romania was represented by 64 athletes and took fifty-second place in the medal table with four medals.

== Medal summary ==
=== Medal by sports ===
| Rank | Sports | Gold | Silver | Bronze | Total |
|---|---|---|---|---|---|
| 1 | Judo | 0 | 0 | 2 | 2 |
| 1 | Table tennis | 0 | 0 | 2 | 2 |
| Totals (2 entries) | | 0 | 0 | 4 | 4 |

Source: rhineruhr2025.com

=== Medalists ===
| Medal | Name | Sport | Event | Date |
|---|---|---|---|---|
| Bronze | Eduard Ionescu; Darius Movileanu | Table tennis | Men's doubles | 23 July |
| Bronze | Florentina Ivănescu | Judo | Women -63 kg | 24 July |
| Bronze | Eduard Ionescu | Table tennis | Men's singles | 24 July |
| Bronze | Alexandru Sibișan | Judo | Men -100 kg | 25 July |
