= China at the 2025 Summer World University Games =

- Flag of China
- IOC code: CHN
- National federation: Federation of Chinese University and School Sports

in Rhine-Ruhr, Germany 16 July 2025 – 27 July 2025
- Competitors: 116 in 14 sports
- Flag bearers: Liu Bei (3x3 basketball); Cui Hechen (badminton)
- Medals Ranked 2nd: Gold 30 Silver 27 Bronze 17 Total 74

Summer World University Games appearances
- 1979; 1981; 1983; 1985; 1987; 1989; 1991; 1993; 1995; 1997; 1999; 2001; 2003; 2005; 2007; 2009; 2011; 2013; 2015; 2017; 2019; 2021; 2025; 2027

China competed at the 2025 Summer World University Games in Rhine-Ruhr, Germany held from 16–27 July 2025. China was represented by 116 athletes and took second place in the medal standings. Liu Bei (3x3 basketball) and Cui Hechen (badminton) were a flag bearer at the opening ceremony.

== Medal summary ==
=== Medal by sports ===
Rank	Sports	Gold	Silver	Bronze	Total
1	Diving	12	8	0	20
2	Athletics	4	4	3	11
3	Taekwondo	4	2	3	9
4	Artistic gymnastics	3	1	1	5
5	Table tennis	2	4	3	9
6	Badminton	2	1	4	7
7	Swimming	1	3	0	4
8	Archery	1	2	1	4
9	Basketball	1	0	0	1
10	Judo	0	1	1	2
11	3x3 basketball	0	1	0	1
12	Tennis	0	0	1	1
Totals (12 entries)		30	27	17	74

Source: rhineruhr2025.com

=== Medalists ===
Medal	Name	Sport	Event	Date
Gold	He Yanwei; Lu Wei	Diving	Women's synchronised 10m platform	17 July
Gold	Wang Weiying; Ouyang Yu	Diving	Women's synchronised 3m springboard	18 July
Gold	Zheng Junzhi	Diving	Men's platform	19 July
Gold	Ai Yanhan	Swimming	Women's 100m freestyle	19 July
Gold	Cui Hechen; Liao Pinyi; Peng Jianqin; Wang Zijun; Zhang Lejian; Zhou Xinyu / Dai Qinyi; Li Qian; Liu Jiayue; Tang Ruizhi; Wang Yiduo; Yuan Anqi	Badminton	Mixed team tournament	20 July
Gold	Lu Wei	Diving	Women's platform	20 July
Gold	Mo Yonghua; Zheng Junzhi	Diving	Men's synchronised 10m platform	20 July
Gold	Xing Jiani	Taekwondo	Women -67kg	20 July
Gold	Ma Jingyue	Taekwondo	Women -49kg	20 July
Gold	Wang Weiying	Diving	Women's 3m springboard	21 July
Gold	Zhang Wenao	Diving	Men's 1m springboard	22 July
Gold	Guo Qing	Taekwondo	Women -53kg	22 July
Gold	Zheng Junzhi; Wang Weiying	Diving	Mixed synchronised 10m platform	23 July
Gold	Zhang Wenao; Hu Yukang	Diving	Men's synchronised 3m springboard	23 July
Gold	Ouyang Yu	Diving	Women's 1m springboard	23 July
Gold	Mei Yingxin; He Yanwei; Lu Wei; Wang Weiying / Ouyang Yu; Qu Zhixin; Wang Yi	Diving	Women's team classification	23 July
Gold	Fan Yi; Hu Yukang; Zheng Junzhi / Mo Yonghua; Mo Zhengxiong; Zhang Wenao	Diving	Men's team classification	23 July
Gold	Han Feier; Wang Xiaotong	Table tennis	Women's doubles	23 July
Gold	Guo Qing; Mu Wenzhe; Xing Jiani	Taekwondo	Women's team kyorugi	23 July
Gold	Shu Heng	Athletics	Men's long jump	24 July
Gold	Zhang Shang	Table tennis	Women's singles	24 July
Gold	Liu Yanxiu; Wang Yan	Archery	Mixed team recurve	25 July
Gold	Li Qingyang; Tian Yuanyuan; Zhao Ruohan; Zhang Zihan; Li Xingnuo; Zhang Shuxuan / Tang Ziting; Chen Yujie; Cao Boyi; Liu Yutong; Na Han	Basketball	Women	25 July
Gold	Yang Fanyuwei	Artistic gymnastics	Women's uneven bars	26 July
Gold	Liu Hengyu	Artistic gymnastics	Men's rings	26 July
Gold	Chen Zhilong	Artistic gymnastics	Men's vault	26 July
Gold	Ma Xiuzhen	Athletics	Women's half marathon	26 July
Gold	Li Qian; Wang Yiduo	Badminton	Women's doubles	26 July
Gold	Zhao Jie	Athletics	Women's hammer throw	27 July
Gold	Ji Haiying; Ning Jinlin; Luo Yue	Athletics	Women's 20km walk team	27 July
Silver	Fan Yi; Mei Yingxin	Diving	Mixed synchronised 3m springboard	17 July
Silver	Liu Shuhan; Ge Chutong; Yu Liyan; Ai Yanhan	Swimming	Women's 4x100m freestyle relay	17 July
Silver	Hu Yukang	Diving	Men's 3m springboard	18 July
Silver	Liu Siyue; Wu Weikang; Yang Lei	Taekwondo	Men's team poomsae	18 July
Silver	Mo Yonghua	Diving	Men's platform	19 July
Silver	Qu Zhixin; Mo Zhengxiong; He Yanwei; Mo Yonghua	Diving	Mixed team (3m / 10m)	19 July
Silver	Liang Yushuai	Taekwondo	Men -68kg	19 July
Silver	Wang Xiaoqing; Liu Bei; Zhang Tao; Gao Ziyue	3x3 basketball	Women	20 July
Silver	Wang Weiying	Diving	Women's platform	20 July
Silver	Ge Chutong; Yu Liyan; Liu Shuhan; Ai Yanhan	Swimming	Women's 4x200m freestyle relay	20 July
Silver	Ao Hualei; Chen Junsong; Sun Zheng; Zeng Beixun	Table tennis	Men's team	20 July
Silver	Han Feier; Wang Xiaotong; Yang Yiyun; Zhao Shang	Table tennis	Women's team	20 July
Silver	Qu Zhixin	Diving	Women's 3m springboard	21 July
Silver	Xiong Shiqi	Athletics	Women's long jump	22 July
Silver	Hu Yukang	Diving	Men's 1m springboard	22 July
Silver	Ai Yanhan	Swimming	Women's 200m freestyle	22 July
Silver	Zeng Beixun; Han Feier	Table tennis	Mixed doubles	22 July
Silver	Wang Yi	Diving	Women's 1m springboard	23 July
Silver	Zhuang Wenna	Judo	Women -48 kg	23 July
Silver	Yang Yiyun; Zhao Shang	Table tennis	Women's doubles	23 July
Silver	Xing Jialiang	Athletics	Men's shot put	24 July
Silver	Qin Wangyu	Archery	Men's individual recurve	26 July
Silver	Liu Yanxiu	Archery	Women's individual recurve	26 July
Silver	Liu Yang	Artistic gymnastics	Men's rings	26 July
Silver	Li Yingcui; Ma Xiuzhen; Wang Jiali	Athletics	Women's half marathon team	26 July
Silver	Cui Hechen; Peng Jianqin	Badminton	Men's doubles	26 July
Silver	Ning Jinlin	Athletics	Women's 20km walk	27 July
Bronze	Wu Weikang; Pan Meijing	Taekwondo	Mixed pair poomsae	17 July
Bronze	Pan Meijing	Taekwondo	Women individual poomsae	17 July
Bronze	Luo Miaoyi	Taekwondo	Women -46kg	19 July
Bronze	Chen Junsong; Wang Xiaotong	Table tennis	Mixed doubles	22 July
Bronze	Li Zongyu; Yao Xinxin	Tennis	Women's doubles	23 July
Bronze	Sun Zheng	Table tennis	Men's singles	24 July
Bronze	Wang Xiaotong	Table tennis	Women's singles	24 July
Bronze	Huang Yuwei; Liu Yanxiu; Wu Zihan	Archery	Women's team recurve	25 July
Bronze	Zhou Xinyu	Badminton	Men's singles	25 July
Bronze	Liao Pinyi; Li Qian	Badminton	Mixed doubles	25 July
Bronze	Jia Chundi	Judo	Women +78 kg	25 July
Bronze	He Xiang	Artistic gymnastics	Men's horizontal bar	26 July
Bronze	Chen Zhongping; Wang Wenjie; Ma Rui	Athletics	Men's half marathon team	26 July
Bronze	Liao Pinyi; Zhang Lejian	Badminton	Men's doubles	26 July
Bronze	Liu Jiayue; Tang Ruizhi	Badminton	Women's doubles	26 July
Bronze	Ji Haiying	Athletics	Women's 20km walk	27 July
Bronze	Huang Peiyang; Sun Chaofan; Hu Xuanfei	Athletics	Men's 20km walk team	27 July
