= France at the 2025 Summer World University Games =

- Flag of France
- IOC code: FRA
- National federation: Fédération Française du Sport Universitaire

in Rhine-Ruhr, Germany 16 July 2025 – 27 July 2025
- Competitors: 125 in 15 sports
- Flag bearers: Sara Balzer (fencing); Samir Aït Saïd (artistic gymnastics)
- Medals Ranked 16th: Gold 3 Silver 5 Bronze 9 Total 17

Summer World University Games appearances
- 1959; 1961; 1963; 1965; 1967; 1970; 1973; 1975; 1977; 1979; 1981; 1983; 1985; 1987; 1989; 1991; 1993; 1995; 1997; 1999; 2001; 2003; 2005; 2007; 2009; 2011; 2013; 2015; 2017; 2019; 2021; 2025; 2027

France competed at the 2025 Summer World University Games in Rhine-Ruhr, Germany held from 16–27 July 2025. France was represented by 125 athletes and took sixteenth place in the medal table. Sara Balzer (fencing) and Samir Aït Saïd (artistic gymnastics) became the flag-bearers.

== Medal summary ==
=== Medal by sports ===
Rank	Sports	Gold	Silver	Bronze	Total
1	Athletics	2	1	0	3
2	Fencing	1	1	1	3
3	Judo	0	1	3	4
4	Swimming	0	1	1	2
5	Badminton	0	1	0	1
6	Artistic gymnastics	0	0	1	1
6	Beach volleyball	0	0	1	1
6	Table tennis	0	0	1	1
6	Taekwondo	0	0	1	1
Totals (9 entries)		3	5	9	17

Source: rhineruhr2025.com

=== Medalists ===
Medal	Name	Sport	Event	Date
Gold	Alice Conrad; Emma Lauvray; Kelly Lusinier; Océane Francillonne	Fencing	Women's epee team	20 July
Gold	Arthur Gervais	Athletics	Men's 5000m	26 July
Gold	Julia David-Smith	Athletics	Women's 5000m	26 July
Silver	Lison Nowaczyk	Swimming	Women's 100m freestyle	19 July
Silver	Mathilde Mouroux; Lola Tranquille; Kelly Lusinier; Garance Roger	Fencing	Women's sabre team	22 July
Silver	Titouan Le Grix	Athletics	Men's 1500m	24 July
Silver	Enogat Roy	Badminton	Men's singles	26 July
Silver	L Beres; D Boursas; C Cancan; T Darbes-Takam; C Devictor; K Issoufi / D Nacer; HJ Ahibo; Y Benezra; H Cargnelli; A Gustan; S Lesauvage	Judo	Mixed team	26 July
Bronze	Esther Bonny	Fencing	Women's foil individual	18 July
Bronze	Léa Beres	Judo	Women -52 kg	23 July
Bronze	Mathys Chouchaoui	Swimming	Men's 200m backstroke	23 July
Bronze	Isà Cok; Camille Lutz	Table tennis	Women's doubles	23 July
Bronze	Théo Lucien; Nahil Mehnana; Bassem Amri	Taekwondo	Men's team kyorugi	23 July
Bronze	Célia Serber; Alisson Lapp; Maëva Guery; Alizée Letrange	Artistic gymnastics	Women's team	24 July
Bronze	Hans-Jorris Ahibo	Judo	Men -73 kg	24 July
Bronze	Théophila Darbes-Takam	Judo	Women -70 kg	24 July
Bronze	Elouan Chouikh-Barbez; Joadel Gardoque	Beach volleyball	Men	26 July
