= Hong Kong at the 2025 Summer World University Games =

- Flag of Hong Kong
- IOC code: HKG
- National federation: University Sports Federation of Hong Kong, China

in Rhine-Ruhr, Germany 16 July 2025 – 27 July 2025
- Competitors: 75 in 10 sports
- Medals Ranked 26th: Gold 2 Silver 1 Bronze 4 Total 7

Summer World University Games appearances
- 1959; 1961; 1963; 1965; 1967; 1970; 1973; 1975; 1977; 1979; 1981; 1983; 1985; 1987; 1989; 1991; 1993; 1995; 1997; 1999; 2001; 2003; 2005; 2007; 2009; 2011; 2013; 2015; 2017; 2019; 2021; 2025; 2027

Hong Kong competed at the 2025 Summer World University Games in Rhine-Ruhr, Germany held from 16 to 27 July 2025. Hong Kong was represented by 75 athletes and took twenty-sixth place in the medal table with 7 medals.

== Medal summary ==
=== Medal by sports ===
Rank	Sports	Gold	Silver	Bronze	Total
1	Table tennis	1	0	3	4
2	Fencing	1	0	1	2
3	Swimming	0	1	0	1
Totals (3 entries)		2	1	4	7

Source: rhineruhr2025.com

=== Medalists ===
Medal	Name	Sport	Event	Date
Gold	Kaylin Hsieh	Fencing	Women's épée individual	17 July
Gold	Baldwin Chan; Yiu Kwan To	Table tennis	Men's doubles	23 July
Silver	Adam Mak	Swimming	Men's 200m breaststroke	20 July
Bronze	Summer Sit	Fencing	Women's sabre individual	19 July
Bronze	Kong Tsz Lam; Lee Hoi Man; Ng Wing Lam; Wong Hoi Tung	Table tennis	Women's team	19 July
Bronze	Baldwin Chan; Wong Hoi Tung	Table tennis	Mixed doubles	22 July
Bronze	Ng Wing Lam	Table tennis	Women's singles	24 July
