= South Korea at the 2025 Summer World University Games =

- Flag of South Korea
- IOC code: KOR
- National federation: Korean University Sports Board

in Rhine-Ruhr, Germany 16 July 2025 – 27 July 2025
- Competitors: 311 in 13 sports
- Medals Ranked 4th: Gold 21 Silver 9 Bronze 27 Total 57

Summer World University Games appearances
- 1959; 1961; 1963; 1965; 1967; 1970; 1973; 1975; 1977; 1979; 1981; 1983; 1985; 1987; 1989; 1991; 1993; 1995; 1997; 1999; 2001; 2003; 2005; 2007; 2009; 2011; 2013; 2015; 2017; 2019; 2021; 2025; 2027

South Korea competed at the 2025 Summer World University Games in Rhine-Ruhr, Germany held from 16–27 July 2025. South Korea took fourth place in the medal standings.

== Medal summary ==
=== Medal by sports ===
| Rank | Sports | Gold | Silver | Bronze | Total |
|---|---|---|---|---|---|
| 1 | Taekwondo | 7 | 4 | 3 | 14 |
| 2 | Fencing | 5 | 1 | 3 | 9 |
| 3 | Judo | 4 | 0 | 3 | 7 |
| 4 | Archery | 3 | 2 | 3 | 8 |
| 5 | Athletics | 1 | 0 | 1 | 2 |
| 5 | Badminton | 1 | 0 | 1 | 2 |
| 7 | Diving | 0 | 1 | 6 | 7 |
| 8 | Swimming | 0 | 1 | 2 | 3 |
| 9 | Artistic gymnastics | 0 | 0 | 3 | 3 |
| 10 | Rhythmic gymnastics | 0 | 0 | 1 | 1 |
| 10 | Table tennis | 0 | 0 | 1 | 1 |
| Totals (11 entries) | | 21 | 9 | 27 | 57 |

Source: rhineruhr2025.com

=== Medalists ===
| Medal | Name | Sport | Event | Date |
|---|---|---|---|---|
| Gold | Park Sang-won | Fencing | Men's sabre individual | 17 July |
| Gold | Oh Min-hyeok | Taekwondo | Men's individual poomsae | 17 July |
| Gold | Cho Ho-yeon; Shin Jin-ho; Kim Chan-ho | Taekwondo | Men's team poomsae | 18 July |
| Gold | Jeon Ha-young | Fencing | Women's sabre individual | 19 July |
| Gold | Kim Yun-seo | Taekwondo | Women -46kg | 19 July |
| Gold | Hwang Hee-geun; Lim Jae-yoon; Park Jung-ho; Park Sang-won | Fencing | Men's sabre team | 20 July |
| Gold | Seo Geon-woo | Taekwondo | Men -80kg | 20 July |
| Gold | Mo Byeo-li; Kim Ho-yeon; Park Ji-hee; Sim So-eun | Fencing | Women's foil team | 21 July |
| Gold | Song Da-bin | Taekwondo | Women +73kg | 21 July |
| Gold | Kang Sang-hyun | Taekwondo | Men +87kg | 21 July |
| Gold | Seon Eun-bi; Jeon Ha-young; Kim Jeong-mi; Choi Se-bin | Fencing | Women's sabre team | 22 July |
| Gold | Jang Se-yun | Judo | Women -52 kg | 23 July |
| Gold | Huh Mi-mi | Judo | Women -57 kg | 23 July |
| Gold | Kim Hyo-hyeok; Kang Sang-hyun; Seo Geon-woo | Taekwondo | Men's team kyorugi | 23 July |
| Gold | Kim Soo-yeon; Moon Ye-eun; Park Ye-rin | Archery | Women's team compound | 25 July |
| Gold | Kim Jong-hoon | Judo | Men -90 kg | 25 July |
| Gold | Kim Ha-yun | Judo | Women +78 kg | 25 July |
| Gold | Nam Su-hyeon | Archery | Women's individual recurve | 26 July |
| Gold | Moon Ye-eun | Archery | Women's individual compound | 26 July |
| Gold | Jin Yong; Lee Jong-min | Badminton | Men's doubles | 26 July |
| Gold | Lee Jae-seong; Kim Jeong-yun; Nwamadi Joel-jin; Seo Min-jun | Athletics | Men's 4 x 100m relay | 27 July |
| Silver | Jung Ha-eun | Taekwondo | Women individual poomsae | 17 July |
| Silver | Kang Min-jae; Han Da-hyun | Taekwondo | Mixed Pair Poomsae | 17 July |
| Silver | Mo Byeo-li | Fencing | Women's foil individual | 18 July |
| Silver | Choi Ji-woo; Son Min-seon; Ryu Tae-gyeong | Taekwondo | Women team poomsae | 18 July |
| Silver | Yoon Ji-hwan | Swimming | Men's 50m backstroke | 21 July |
| Silver | Kim Ji-wook; Kim Yeong-ho; Kim Yeong-taek; Choi Gan-gin | Diving | Men's team classification | 23 July |
| Silver | Seo Yeo-won; Kwak Min-ju; Song Da-bin | Taekwondo | Women's team kyorugi | 23 July |
| Silver | Park Ye-rin; Park Seung-hyun | Archery | Mixed team compound | 25 July |
| Silver | Kim Ye-chan; Kim Seon-woo; Seo Min-gi | Archery | Men's team recurve | 25 July |
| Bronze | Hwang Hee-geun | Fencing | Men's sabre individual | 17 July |
| Bronze | Lee Eun-ji | Swimming | Women's 200m backstroke | 18 July |
| Bronze | Oh Soo-yeon; Kim Ji-wook; Kim Na-hyun; Kim Yeong-taek | Diving | Mixed team (3m / 10m) | 19 July |
| Bronze | Kim Yeong-taek | Diving | Men's platform | 19 July |
| Bronze | Choi Min-seo | Fencing | Men's foil individual | 19 July |
| Bronze | Park Do-gyeong; Kim Joo-won; Kim Min / Lee So-yoon; Lee So-yun; Ko Ye-jin | Rhythmic gymnastics | Group 5 ribbons | 19 July |
| Bronze | Choi Hyo-won; Choi Ji-hoon; Jin Yong; Kang Geon-hui; Kim Chae-jung; Kim Yun-ju / Lee Chae-eun; Lee Hye-won; Lee Jong-min; Lee So-yul; Park Seung-min; Park Si-hyun | Badminton | Mixed team tournament | 20 July |
| Bronze | Kim Ji-wook; Kim Yeong-taek | Diving | Men's synchronised 10m platform | 20 July |
| Bronze | Park Ha-been; Kim Na-kyeong; Kim Tae-hee; Lim Tae-hee | Fencing | Women's epee team | 20 July |
| Bronze | Lee Eun-ji | Swimming | Women's 100m backstroke | 20 July |
| Bronze | Kwak Min-ju | Taekwondo | Women -67kg | 20 July |
| Bronze | Seo Yeo-won | Taekwondo | Women -53kg | 22 July |
| Bronze | Oh Seung-ju | Taekwondo | Women -73kg | 22 July |
| Bronze | Oh Soo-yeon; Kim Seo-yeon; Kim Seung-hyun / Choi Yu-jeong; Kim Na-hyun; Kim Ye-lim | Diving | Women's team classification | 23 July |
| Bronze | Kim Ji-wook; Kim Yeong-taek | Diving | Men's synchronised 3m springboard | 23 July |
| Bronze | Kim Yeong-taek; Kim Na-hyun | Diving | Mixed synchronised 10m platform | 23 July |
| Bronze | Cho Dae-seong; Yun Chang-min | Table tennis | Men's doubles | 23 July |
| Bronze | Lee Jae-seong | Athletics | Men's 200m | 24 July |
| Bronze | Lee Joon-hwan | Judo | Men -81 kg | 24 July |
| Bronze | Kim Sung-chul; Lee Eun-ho; Park Seung-hyun | Archery | Men's team compound | 25 July |
| Bronze | Nam Su-hyeon; Seo Min-gi | Archery | Mixed team recurve | 25 July |
| Bronze | Kim Min-ju | Judo | Women -78 kg | 25 July |
| Bronze | Park Ye-rin | Archery | Women's individual compound | 26 July |
| Bronze | Kim Jae-ho | Artistic gymnastics | Men's vault | 26 July |
| Bronze | Moon Geon-young | Artistic gymnastics | Men's parallel bars | 26 July |
| Bronze | Moon Geon-young | Artistic gymnastics | Men's floor exercise | 26 July |
| Bronze | Huh Mi-mi; Jang Se-yun; Kim Ha-yun; Kim Min-ju; Lee Ye-rang; Shin Chae-won / An Jae-hong; Hwang Hye-sung; Kim Jong-hoon; Lee Joon-hwan; Song Woo-hyeok; Yoon Hyeon-su | Judo | Mixed team | 26 July |
