= Japan at the 2025 Summer World University Games =

- Flag of Japan
- IOC code: JPN
- National federation: Japan University Sports Board

in Rhine-Ruhr, Germany 16 July 2025 – 27 July 2025
- Medals Ranked 1st: Gold 34 Silver 21 Bronze 24 Total 79

Summer World University Games appearances
- 1959; 1961; 1963; 1965; 1967; 1970; 1973; 1975; 1977; 1979; 1981; 1983; 1985; 1987; 1989; 1991; 1993; 1995; 1997; 1999; 2001; 2003; 2005; 2007; 2009; 2011; 2013; 2015; 2017; 2019; 2021; 2025; 2027

Japan competed at the 2025 Summer World University Games in Rhine-Ruhr, Germany held from 16 to 27 July 2025.

== Medal summary ==
=== Medal by sports ===
Rank	Sports	Gold	Silver	Bronze	Total
1	Artistic gymnastics	8	8	1	17
2	Judo	8	2	4	14
3	Athletics	5	3	3	11
4	Tennis	5	0	0	5
5	Swimming	3	5	7	15
6	Archery	2	1	1	4
6	Table tennis	2	1	1	4
8	Fencing	1	0	4	5
9	Volleyball	0	1	0	1
10	Badminton	0	0	2	2
11	Rhythmic gymnastics	0	0	1	1
Totals (11 entries)		34	21	24	79

Source: rhineruhr2025.com

=== Medalists ===
Medal	Name	Sport	Event	Date
Gold	Takumi Mori	Swimming	Men's 200 m individual medley	July 20
Gold	Sakura Aoi; Mana Asada; Kyoka Idesawa; Kotomi Omoda	Table tennis	Women's team	July 20
Gold	Yumeno Kusuda	Swimming	Women's 200 m breaststroke	July 22
Gold	Seiya Asami; Naoshi Nakamoto; Ryu Matsumoto; Hidemasa Sakato	Fencing	Men's team épée	July 22
Gold	Tsuyoshi Hasegawa; Daiki Hashimoto; Shohei Kawakami; Shinnosuke Oka; Tomoharu Tsunogai	Artistic gymnastics	Men's team all-around	July 23
Gold	Shunsuke Okano; Kyoka Idesawa	Table tennis	Mixed doubles	July 23
Gold	Kairi Kentoku	Judo	Men -66 kg	July 24
Gold	Yamato Fukuda	Judo	Men -60 kg	July 24
Gold	Mizuki Harada	Judo	Women -48 kg	July 24
Gold	Urara Ashikawa; Kokoro Fukasawa; Shoko Miyata; Mana Okamura; Kohane Ushioku	Artistic gymnastics	Women's team all-around	July 24
Gold	Takumi Mori	Swimming	Men's 400 m individual medley	July 24
Gold	Daiki Hashimoto	Artistic gymnastics	Men's individual all-around	July 25
Gold	Ange Oby Kajuru; Kanon Yamaguchi	Tennis	Women's doubles	July 25
Gold	Shoko Miyata	Artistic gymnastics	Women's individual all-around	July 25
Gold	Tetsuya Aoshima; Yuya Funahashi; Kosei Shirai	Archery	Men's team recurve	July 25
Gold	Nanami Asakuno; Waka Sonoda; Ruka Uehara	Archery	Women's team recurve	July 25
Gold	Kaito Amano	Judo	Men -81 kg	July 25
Gold	Rin Maeda	Judo	Women -70 kg	July 25
Gold	Narumi Tanioka	Judo	Women -63 kg	July 25
Gold	Natsuki Yoshimoto; Jay Dylan Hara Friend	Tennis	Mixed doubles	July 25
Gold	Tatsuki Abe	Athletics	Men's 110 m hurdles	July 25
Gold	Shoko Miyata	Artistic gymnastics	Women's vault	July 26
Gold	Urara Ashikawa	Artistic gymnastics	Women's balance beam	July 26
Gold	Tomoharu Tsunogai	Artistic gymnastics	Men's parallel bars	July 26
Gold	Shoko Miyata	Artistic gymnastics	Women's floor exercise	July 26
Gold	Jay Dylan Hara Friend	Tennis	Men's singles	July 26
Gold	Yu Tanaka; Jay Dylan Hara Friend; Yua Taka; Saki Tange	Tennis	Men's Team	July 26
Gold	Yuta Nakamura	Judo	Men +100 kg	July 26
Gold	Kanon Yamaguchi; Ange Oby Kajuru; Natsuki Yoshimoto	Tennis	Women's team	July 26
Gold	Shinsaku Kudo	Athletics	Men's half marathon	July 26
Gold	Ryuto Uehara; Kento Baba; Shinsaku Kudo; Keisuke Hara; Atsuki Tsuchiya; Taisei Yoshizako	Athletics	Men's half marathon team	July 26
Gold	Ayaka Maeda; Makoto Tsuchiya; Aoi Takahashi; Mariya Noda	Athletics	Women's half marathon team	July 26
Gold	Mizuki Sugimura; Yuta Nakamura; Ryuga Tanaka; Miki Mukunoki; Komei Kawabata; Narumi Tanioka; Moa Ono; Hako Fukunaga; Kairi Kentoku; Rin Maeda; Nozomu Miki; Kaito Amano	Judo	Mixed team	July 27
Gold	Keisuke Hara; Taisei Yoshizako; Atsuki Tsuchiya	Athletics	Men's 20 km walk team	July 27
Silver	Takumi Mori; Takaki Hara; Yuta Watanabe; Konosuke Yanagimoto; Shoon Mitsunaga	Swimming	Men's 4 × 100 m freestyle relay	July 18
Silver	Yuyumi Obatake	Swimming	Women's 200 m breaststroke	July 22
Silver	Takumi Mori; Takaki Hara; Ayu Mizoguchi; Rio Suzuki; Sakura Ohshima; Yuta Watanabe; Konosuke Yanagimoto	Swimming	Mixed 4 × 100 m freestyle relay	July 22
Silver	Reo Okura	Swimming	Men's 50 m breaststroke	July 23
Silver	Ameze Miyabe; Haruka Oyama; Saki Ishikura; Rina Yamaji; Natsumi Kodama; Rin Honda; Emili Iiyama; Ayaka Sato; Rino Takizawa; Akane Abe; Niina Kumagai; Satsuki Nakagawa	Volleyball	Women's volleyball	July 23
Silver	Shunsuke Okano; Yuma Tanigaki	Table Tennis	Men's doubles	July 24
Silver	Hako Fukunaga	Judo	Women -52 kg	July 24
Silver	Riku Yamaguchi	Swimming	Men's 400 m individual medley	July 24
Silver	Shohei Kawakami	Artistic gymnastics	Men's individual all-around	July 25
Silver	Mana Okamura	Artistic gymnastics	Women's individual all-around	July 25
Silver	Koki Fujihara	Athletics	Men's long jump	July 25
Silver	Shinnosuke Oka	Artistic gymnastics	Men's floor exercise	July 26
Silver	Kohane Ushioku	Artistic gymnastics	Women's vault	July 26
Silver	Daiki Hashimoto	Artistic gymnastics	Men's pommel horse	July 26
Silver	Shinnosuke Oka	Artistic gymnastics	Men's parallel bars	July 26
Silver	Kohane Ushioku	Artistic gymnastics	Women's floor exercise	July 26
Silver	Daiki Hashimoto	Artistic gymnastics	Men's horizontal bar	July 26
Silver	Miki Mukunoki	Judo	Women +78 kg	July 26
Silver	Waka Sonoda; Yuya Funahashi	Archery	Mixed team recurve	July 26
Silver	Makoto Tsuchiya	Athletics	Women's half marathon	July 26
Silver	Atsuki Tsuchiya	Athletics	Men's 20 km walk	July 27
Bronze	Ayami Suzuki	Swimming	Women's 400 m individual medley	July 19
Bronze	Airi Higashi; Miu Omachi; Noa Futatsugi; Hana Kumasaka; Nonoka Murakuni; Rika Nakamura	Rhythmic gymnastics	Group all-around	July 19
Bronze	Chirika Takahashi	Fencing	Women's individual sabre	July 20
Bronze	Shunsuke Okano; Yuma Tanigaki; Kanta Tokuda; Jo Yokotani	Table tennis	Men's team	July 20
Bronze	Ruka Takezawa	Swimming	Women's 800 m freestyle	July 20
Bronze	Yuta Watanabe	Swimming	Men's 200 m individual medley	July 20
Bronze	Hibiki Kato; Hayato Tsubo; Yuto Rikitake; Reo Hiwatashi	Fencing	Women's team sabre	July 21
Bronze	Ruka Takezawa; Rio Suzuki; Hanane Hironaka; Kanon Nagao; Sakura Ohshima; Riko Sawano	Swimming	Women's 4 × 200 m freestyle relay	July 21
Bronze	Yuzuha Takeyama; Rino Nagase; Ayano Iimura; Reina Iwamoto	Fencing	Women's team foil	July 22
Bronze	Niko Aoki	Swimming	Women's 1500 m freestyle	July 22
Bronze	Ryosuke Fukuda; Shoren Hayashi; Yasutaka Nishiguchi; Hiroto Sugaya	Fencing	Men's team foil	July 23
Bronze	Hiroki Yanagita	Athletics	Men's 100 m	July 23
Bronze	Takumi Mori; Konosuke Yanagimoto; Takaki Hara; Hiroto Shimizu; Yuta Watanabe	Swimming	Men's 4 × 200 m freestyle relay	July 23
Bronze	Moa Ono	Judo	Women -57 kg	July 24
Bronze	Yuga Nishimura; Reo Okura; Riku Kitagawa; Takaki Hara; Yusuke Sato; Yuma Yoshida	Swimming	Men's 4 × 100 m medley relay	July 24
Bronze	Ryuga Tanaka	Judo	Men -73 kg	July 25
Bronze	Rei Miyashita	Badminton	Men's singles	July 25
Bronze	Shoko Miyata	Artistic gymnastics	Women's uneven bars	July 26
Bronze	Ruka Uehara	Archery	Women individual recurve	July 26
Bronze	Sumire Nakade; Yumi Tanabe	Badminton	Women's doubles	July 26
Bronze	Mariya Noda	Athletics	Women's half marathon	July 26
Bronze	Nozomu Miki	Judo	Men -100 kg	July 26
Bronze	Komei Kawabata	Judo	Men -90 kg	July 26
Bronze	Ryuto Uehara	Athletics	Men's half marathon	July 26
