= Swimming at the 2025 Summer World University Games – Men's 100 metre freestyle =

Men's 100 metre freestyle at the 2025 Summer World University Games
- Venue: Schwimm- und Sprunghalle im Europasportpark
- Location: Berlin
- Dates: 20 July (heats and semifinals); 21 July (final)
- Competitors: 78 from 48 nations

Medalists
gold medal	Matthew King	United States
silver medal	Pieter Coetze	South Africa
bronze medal	Aleksandr Shchegolev	Individual Neutral Athletes

The men's 100 metre freestyle at the 2025 Summer World University Games in Rhine-Ruhr, Germany was held from 20 to 21 July 2025. Matthew King from the United States won the gold medal, Pieter Coetze from South Africa took the silver medal and Aleksandr Shchegolev from Individual Neutral Athletes earned the bronze medal.

== Schedule ==
All times are Central European Time (UTC+1)

Date	Time	Round
20 July	10:13	Heats
20 July	19:00	Semifinals
21 July	19:07	Final

== Records ==
Prior to the competition, the world and Universiade records were as follows.

Category	Swimmer	Record	Date	Place	Event
World record	(China) Pan Zhanle	46.40	31 July 2024	Paris, France	2024 Summer Olympics
Universiade record	(Russia) Vladimir Morozov	47.62	10 July 2013	Kazan, Russia	2013 Summer Universiade

== Results ==
=== Heats ===
All entered athletes competed across multiple seeded heats in the morning session. Swimmers with the top 16 fastest times advanced, regardless of which individual heat they swam.

Rank	Heat	Lane	Swimmer	Nation	Time	Notes
1	9	5	Patrick Dinu	Romania	48.49	Q
2	8	6	Aleksandr Shchegolev	Individual Neutral Athletes	48.57	Q
3	9	6	Marcus Da Silva	Australia	49.00	Q
3	9	3	Takaki Hara	Japan	49.00	Q
5	9	4	Pieter Coetze	South Africa	49.02	Q
6	10	4	Matthew King	United States	49.06	Q
7	8	3	Ole Eidam	Germany	49.14	Q
8	10	3	Kaique Alves	Brazil	49.18	Q
9	8	7	Illia Linnyk	Ukraine	49.40	Q
10	8	5	Dmitrii Zhavoronkov	Individual Neutral Athletes	49.43	Q
11	8	4	Camden Taylor	United States	49.44	Q
12	6	7	Srihari Nataraj	India	49.46	Q
13	10	5	Vinicius Assunção	Brazil	49.52	Q
14	7	2	Charlie Skoglund	Sweden	49.53	Q
15	10	8	Dominik Dudys	Poland	49.56	Q
16	7	5	Gabriel Gorgas	Australia	49.58	Q
17	9	8	Tiago Behar	Switzerland	49.59	
18	8	1	Maddox Roberts	Great Britain	49.60	
19	8	2	Lorenzo Actis Dato	Italy	49.63	
20	10	6	Luca Serio	Italy	49.65	
21	10	7	Ruard Van Renen	South Africa	49.71	
22	7	6	Nikolas Antoniou	Cyprus	49.77	
23	7	4	Robin Yeboah	Switzerland	49.82	
24	5	4	Siim Kesküla	Estonia	49.84	
25	10	2	Shoon Mitsunaga	Japan	49.88	
26	6	2	Chris Weeks	Canada	49.92	
27	6	6	Ronny Brännkärr	Finland	49.99	
28	7	7	Arvin Singh	Malaysia	50.05	
29	7	3	Diogo Ramos	Portugal	50.11	
30	9	1	Lars Kuljus	Estonia	50.14	
31	6	4	Daniil Pancerevas	Lithuania	50.20	
32	7	1	Lim Yin Chuen	Malaysia	50.28	
33	6	3	Erik Falk	Sweden	50.30	
34	9	7	Moritz Schaller	Germany	50.31	
35	7	8	Kacper Klimczak	Poland	50.39	
36	5	5	Pierre Largeron	France	50.41	
37	6	5	Leon Opatril	Austria	50.47	
38	8	8	Gustavo Carvalhais	Portugal	50.58	
39	5	6	Enkhtamir Batbayar	Mongolia	50.61	
40	5	2	Jokūbas Keblys	Lithuania	50.64	
41	5	7	Emre Gürdenli	Turkey	50.65	
41	10	1	Angelo Giani	Great Britain	50.65	
43	1	6	Abdurrahman Rustamov	Azerbaijan	50.87	
44	5	8	Ho Siu Lun	Hong Kong	51.04	
45	6	1	Fan Chen-wei	Chinese Taipei	51.12	
46	6	8	Sage Tan	Singapore	51.39	
47	3	5	Durai Thomas	India	51.45	
47	4	3	Nathan Chan	Hong Kong	51.45	
49	4	1	Fu Kun-ming	Chinese Taipei	51.50	
50	4	5	Staņislavs Šakels	Latvia	51.53	
51	4	4	Kerem Carban	Turkey	51.73	
52	5	1	Jakub Poliačik	Slovakia	51.78	
53	2	4	Ng Chi Hin	Macau	51.80	
53	1	2	Nicolas Retrive	Argentina	51.80	
55	5	3	Nikolas Kosta	Cyprus	51.87	
56	4	8	Mamuka Shengelia	Georgia	51.95	
57	4	2	Arne Furlan	Slovenia	51.96	
58	4	6	Jegors Mihailovs	Latvia	52.08	
59	4	7	Samuel Tang	Singapore	52.36	
60	3	4	Abdulazizbek Abdumajidov	Uzbekistan	52.54	
61	1	1	Agustin Rasche	Argentina	52.64	
62	3	6	Ondrej Duša	Slovakia	52.66	
63	3	7	Rishat Zhumagulov	Kazakhstan	52.70	
64	2	3	Rashad Alguliyev	Azerbaijan	53.23	
65	3	3	Luka Tsuriashvili	Georgia	53.24	
66	3	2	Tudor Vartic	Moldova	53.45	
67	2	7	Steven Jaramillo	Ecuador	53.54	
68	3	1	Andrés Estrada	Colombia	54.27	
69	3	8	Andrés Arias	Colombia	54.29	
70	2	5	Ashot Chakhoyan	Armenia	54.66	
71	2	6	Bjourn Mhlanga	Zimbabwe	55.01	
72	2	8	Carlos Castillo	Ecuador	55.16	
73	2	1	Nicolas Bobadilla	Chile	55.53	
74	2	2	Chris Wijayalath	Sri Lanka	55.73	
75	1	4	Induwara Liyanage	Sri Lanka	58.41	
76	1	7	Marc Fares	Lebanon	58.45	
77	1	3	Moosa Aulad	Oman	59.65	
78	1	5	Ayan Asif	Pakistan	1:03.44	

=== Semifinals ===
The 16 advancing swimmers were split into two semifinal heats of 8 during the evening session. The swimmers recording the top 8 fastest times advanced to the final round.

Rank	Heat	Lane	Swimmer	Nation	Time	Notes
1	2	3	Pieter Coetze	South Africa	48.30	Q
2	1	3	Matthew King	United States	48.34	Q
3	2	4	Patrick Dinu	Romania	48.47	Q
4	1	2	Dmitrii Zhavoronkov	Individual Neutral Athletes	48.59	Q
5	1	4	Aleksandr Shchegolev	Individual Neutral Athletes	48.67	Q
6	1	5	Marcus Da Silva	Australia	48.77	Q
7	1	6	Kaique Alves	Brazil	48.81	Q
8	2	6	Ole Eidam	Germany	49.06	Q
9	2	2	Illia Linnyk	Ukraine	49.16	
10	2	1	Vinicius Assunção	Brazil	49.17	
11	2	5	Takaki Hara	Japan	49.22	
12	2	8	Dominik Dudys	Poland	49.29	
13	1	1	Charlie Skoglund	Sweden	49.36	
14	2	7	Camden Taylor	United States	49.37	
15	1	7	Srihari Nataraj	India	49.56	
16	1	8	Gabriel Gorgas	Australia	49.87	

=== Final ===
The fastest 8 swimmers competed in a single race to determine the gold, silver and bronze medalists.

Rank	Lane	Swimmer	Nation	Time	Notes
1st place, gold medalist(s)	5	Matthew King	United States	48.01	
2nd place, silver medalist(s)	4	Pieter Coetze	South Africa	48.12	
3rd place, bronze medalist(s)	2	Aleksandr Shchegolev	Individual Neutral Athletes	48.34	
4	3	Patrick Dinu	Romania	48.40	
5	8	Ole Eidam	Germany	48.80	
6	7	Marcus Da Silva	Australia	48.85	
7	1	Kaique Alves	Brazil	49.03	
8	6	Dmitrii Zhavoronkov	Individual Neutral Athletes	49.28	
