= Judo at the 2025 Summer World University Games – Men's 90 kg =

Men's 90 kg at the 2025 Summer World University Games
- Venue: Messe Essen
- Location: Essen
- Dates: 25 July
- Competitors: 31

Medalists
gold medal	Kim Jong-hoon	South Korea
silver medal	Eljan Hajiyev	Azerbaijan
bronze medal	Komei Kawabata	Japan
bronze medal	Gergely Nerpel	Hungary

The men's 90 kg at the 2025 Summer World University Games in Rhine-Ruhr, Germany was held 25 July 2025. Kim Jong-hoon of South Korea captured the gold medal. Eljan Hajiyev of Azerbaijan took home the silver medal. The bronze medals were awarded to Komei Kawabata of Japan and Gergely Nerpel of Hungary.

== Schedule ==
All times are Central European Time (UTC+1)

Date	Time	Event
25 July 2015	10:00	Preliminary Rounds
25 July 2015	17:00	Final Block

== Results ==
Athletes advanced through direct knockout rounds—including the round of 32, round of 16, quarterfinals, and semifinals—to determine the two finalists fighting for the gold and silver medals. Parallel to the main bracket, a repechage system allowed defeated quarterfinalists to work their way back into the tournament, culminating in two separate bronze medal matches where the repechage winners faced the losing semifinalists.

Round of 32
G Morais (BRA)	020
V Lennert (AUT)	000
S Rizoev (TJK)	000
M Şimşek (TUR)	100
A Šlyteris (LTU)	021
J Condella (USA)	000
N Murtozoev (UZB)	000
J de Bruin (NED)	010
M Kryzhanskyi (UKR)	000
A Santamaría (ESP)	020
K Bedel (ITA)	110
G Osoba (NGR)	000 (yellow card)
Y Benezra (FRA)	000
G Nerpel (HUN)	010 (yellow card)
K Kawabata (JPN)	001
M Latîșev (MDA)	000 (yellow card)
N Christiaens (BEL)	000 (yellow card)
A Arapov (KAZ)	010 (yellow card)
A Japaridze (GEO)	022
A Batdorj (MGL)	000
T Štefánik (SVK)	112 (yellow card)
H Padilla (ECU)	000
Kim Jh (KOR)	100
A Ishenbaev (KGZ)	000 (yellow card)
L Schriever (GER)	000
R Musil (CZE)	001
Chen Py (TPE)	000
J Bulić (CRO)	001 (yellow card)
N Pečnik (SLO)	100
S Ningthoujam (IND)	000

Round of 16
E Hajiyev (AZE)	100
G Morais (BRA)	010 (yellow card)
M Şimşek (TUR)	000
A Šlyteris (LTU)	001 (yellow card)
J de Bruin (NED)	100
A Santamaría (ESP)	020
K Bedel (ITA)	000 (yellow card)
G Nerpel (HUN)	001 (yellow card)
K Kawabata (JPN)	001
A Arapov (KAZ)	000 (yellow card)
A Japaridze (GEO)	100
T Štefánik (SVK)	000
Kim Jh (KOR)	100
R Musil (CZE)	000
J Bulić (CRO)	000
N Pečnik (SLO)	010 (yellow card)

Quarter-finals
E Hajiyev (AZE)	100
A Šlyteris (LTU)	000
J de Bruin (NED)	000
G Nerpel (HUN)	100 (yellow card)
K Kawabata (JPN)	100
A Japaridze (GEO)	000 (yellow card)
Kim Jh (KOR)	100
N Pečnik (SLO)	000

Semi-finals
E Hajiyev (AZE)	100
G Nerpel (HUN)	000
K Kawabata (JPN)	000 (yellow card)
Kim Jh (KOR)	100

Final
E Hajiyev (AZE)	000 (yellow card)
Kim Jh (KOR)	011 (yellow card)

Repechage Phases

Repechage
A Šlyteris (LTU)	010
J de Bruin (NED)	100
A Japaridze (GEO)	000
N Pečnik (SLO)	100

Bronze medal
J de Bruin (NED)	000
K Kawabata (JPN)	100
N Pečnik (SLO)	000 (yellow card)
G Nerpel (HUN)	102 (yellow card)
