= Ukraine at the 2025 Summer World University Games =

- Flag of Ukraine
- IOC code: UKR

in Rhine-Ruhr, Germany 16 July 2025 – 27 July 2025
- Competitors: 106 (54 men and 52 women) in 10 sports
- Medals Ranked 14th: Gold 4 Silver 3 Bronze 5 Total 12

Summer Universiade appearances (overview)
- 1993; 1995; 1997; 1999; 2001; 2003; 2005; 2007; 2009; 2011; 2013; 2015; 2017; 2019; 2021; 2025; 2027

Ukraine competed at the 2025 Summer World University Games in the Rhine-Ruhr metropolitan region, Germany, that was held from 16 to 27 July 2025. Ukraine did not compete in 3x3 basketball, basketball, beach volleyball, table tennis, tennis, volleyball, water polo, and wheelchair 3x3 basketball.

== Medal summary ==
=== Medal by sports ===
Medals by sport
Sport	1st place, gold medalist(s)	2nd place, silver medalist(s)	3rd place, bronze medalist(s)	Total
Taekwondo	2	0	2	4
Rhythmic gymnastics	1	2	0	3
Athletics	1	0	2	3
Fencing	0	1	1	2
Total	4	3	5	12

=== Medalists ===
Medal	Name	Sport	Event	Date
Gold	Valeriia Panchenko; Kateryna Hrachova; Emiliia Lavrynets; Daniela Chebatarova; Marta Borys; Bohdana Melnyk	Rhythmic gymnastics	3 balls + 2 hoops	19 July
Gold	Maksym Manenkov	Taekwondo	Men's –58 kg	20 July
Gold	Artem Harbar	Taekwondo	Men's –87 kg	22 July
Gold	Mykhaylo Kokhan	Athletics	Men's hammer throw	23 July
Silver	Anna Maksymenko	Fencing	Women's épée	17 July
Silver	Valeriia Panchenko; Kateryna Hrachova; Emiliia Lavrynets; Daniela Chebatarova; Marta Borys; Bohdana Melnyk	Rhythmic gymnastics	Group all-around	19 July
Silver	Valeriia Panchenko; Kateryna Hrachova; Emiliia Lavrynets; Daniela Chebatarova; Marta Borys; Bohdana Melnyk	Rhythmic gymnastics	5 ribbons	19 July
Bronze	Emily Conrad	Fencing	Women's épée	17 July
Bronze	Kyrylo Hurnov	Taekwondo	Men's –80 kg	20 July
Bronze	Andrii Harbar	Taekwondo	Men's +87 kg	21 July
Bronze	Mykhailo Brudin	Athletics	Men's discus throw	22 July
Bronze	Mykola Rushchak	Athletics	Men's 20 km walk	27 July

== Competitors ==
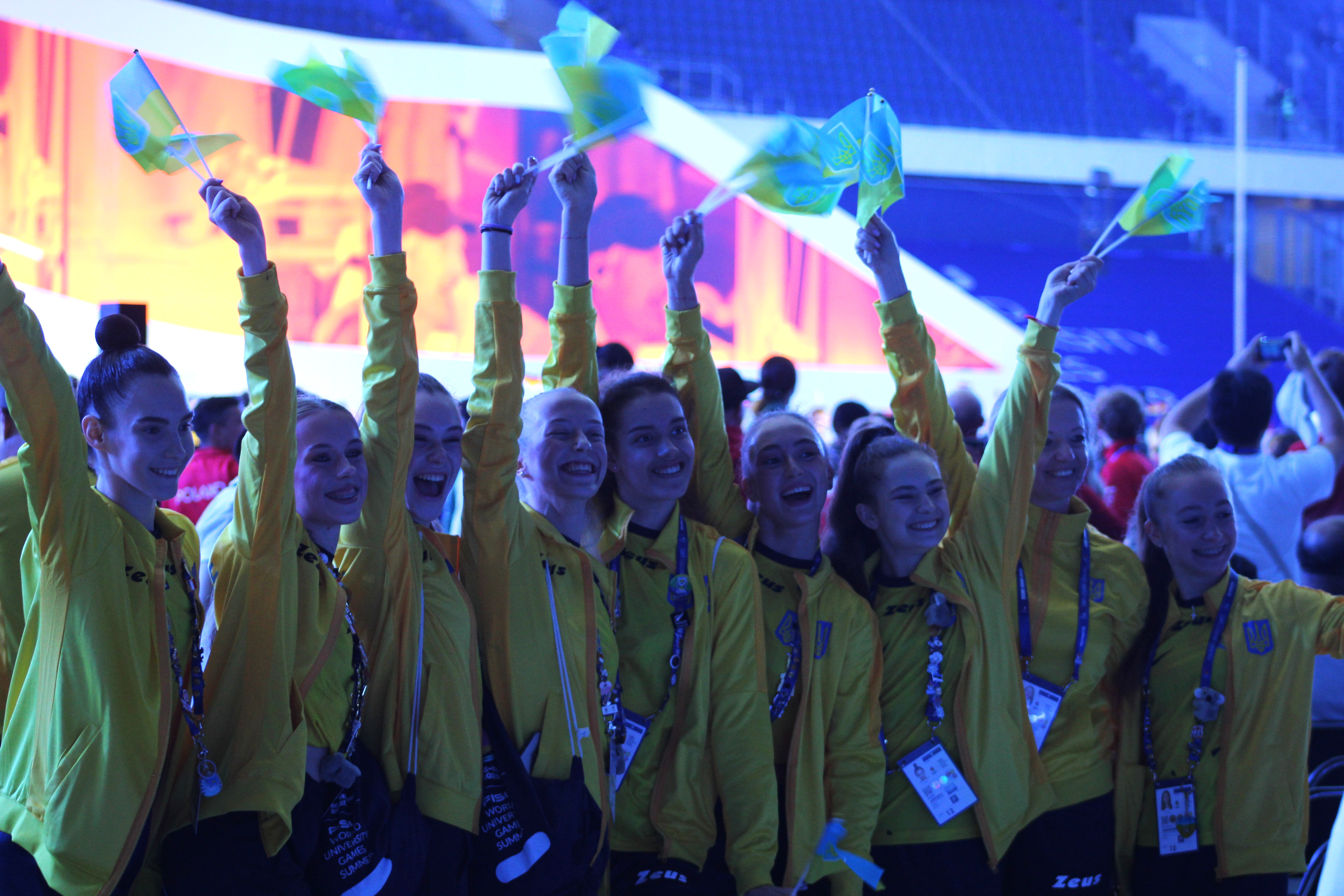
Team Ukraine at the Opening Ceremony

The team included four Olympians: Nazar Chepurnyi, Mykhaylo Kokhan (2024 Olympics bronze medallist), Nika Sharafutdinova, Maryana Shostak. Kokhan won a gold medal at the Games.

Sport	Men	Women	Total
Archery	5	6	11
Artistic gymnastics	5	2	7
Athletics	9	12	21
Badminton	2	2	4
Fencing	8	5	13
Judo	7	6	13
Rhythmic gymnastics	—N/a	7	7
Rowing	7	4	11
Swimming	4	1	5
Taekwondo	7	7	14
Total	54	52	106

== Archery ==
Recurve

Athlete	Event	Ranking round		Round of 48	Round of 24	Round of 16 (12)	Quarterfinals	Semifinals	Final / BM	
Athlete	Event	Score	Seed	Opposition Score	Opposition Score	Opposition Score	Opposition Score	Opposition Score	Opposition Score	Rank
Artem Batrachenko	Men's individual	590	72	Marquez Saenz (MEX); W 6–0	Shirai (JPN); L 0–6	Did not advance				
Bohdan Ilyin	Men's individual	579	77	Aliyev (AZE); L 1–7	Did not advance					
Iryna Tretiakova	Women's individual	639	22	Bye	Marasli (TUR); L 0–6	Did not advance				
Dzvenyslava Chernyk	Women's individual	634	26	Bye	Ala-Aho (FIN); W 6–2	Asakuno (JPN); L 4–6	Did not advance			
Iryna Yarmak	Women's individual	609	46	Gjelsvik (NOR); W 7–1	Abdusattorova (UZB); L 0–6	Did not advance				
Iryna Tretiakova; Dzvenyslava Chernyk; Iryna Yarmak	Women's team	1882	9	—N/a		Bye	Germany; L 2–6	Did not advance		
Iryna Tretiakova; Artem Batrachenko	Mixed team	1229	22	—N/a		Israel; L 2–6	Did not advance			

Compound

Athlete	Event	Ranking round		Round of 48	Round of 24	Round of 16 (12)	Quarterfinals	Semifinals	Final / BM	
Athlete	Event	Score	Seed	Opposition Score	Opposition Score	Opposition Score	Opposition Score	Opposition Score	Opposition Score	Rank
Vitalii Vdovenko	Men's individual	693	16	Bye	Ong (SGP); W 143–141	Konecki (POL); L 140–143	Did not advance			
Sviatoslav Karpenko	Men's individual	675	48	Bye	Konecki (POL); L 141–143	Did not advance				
Daniil Nedelko	Men's individual	671	54	Mussa (KAZ); W 140–139	Brenk (SLO); L 136–142	Did not advance				
Vitalii Vdovenko; Sviatoslav Karpenko; Daniil Nedelko	Men's team	2039	10	—N/a			Malaysia; L 229–234	Did not advance		
Olha Khomutovska	Women's individual	677	15	—N/a	Smajic (SLO); W 143–119	Boulton (GBR); L 141–146	Did not advance			
Viktoriia Kardash	Women's individual	658	31	—N/a	Mahari (MAS); L 135–143	Did not advance				
Yelyzaveta Sushko	Women's individual	618	48	—N/a	Aloisi (ITA); L 131–141	Did not advance				
Olha Khomutovska; Viktoriia Kardash; Yelyzaveta Sushko	Women's team	1953	10	—N/a			Italy; L 217–224	Did not advance		
Vitalii Vdovenko; Olha Khomutovska	Mixed team	1370	9	—N/a		Bye	Kazakhstan; L 151–155	Did not advance		

== Artistic gymnastics ==
Men
Team all-around

Athlete	Event	Apparatus						Total	Rank
Athlete	Event	F	PH	R	V	PB	HB	Total	Rank
Nazar Chepurnyi	Team all-around	11.800	10.966	12.666	14.500	12.800	12.866	229.528	11
Dmytro Prudko	Team all-around	12.800		13.266	13.166	13.066	12.200	229.528	11
Bohdan Suprun	Team all-around	13.100	11.700	12.966	12.666			229.528	11
Yehor Perepolkin	Team all-around			~~12.066~~	~~12.500~~			229.528	11
Ihor Dyshuk	Team all-around		14.100			12.100	12.800	229.528	11

Individual all-around

Athlete	Event	Qualification								Final							
Athlete	Event	Apparatus						Total	Rank	Apparatus						Total	Rank
Athlete	Event	F	PH	R	V	PB	HB	Total	Rank	F	PH	R	V	PB	HB	Total	Rank
Nazar Chepurnyi	Individual all-around	11.800	10.966	12.666	14.500	12.800	12.866	75.598	25	Did not qualify							
Yehor Perepolkin	Individual all-around			12.066	12.500			DNF		Did not qualify							

Individual apparatus finals

Athlete	Event	Total	Rank
Nazar Chepurnyi	Vault	13.833	4
Ihor Dyshuk	Pommel horse	12.500	7

Women
Individual all-around

Athlete	Event	Qualification						Final					
Athlete	Event	Apparatus				Total	Rank	Apparatus				Total	Rank
Athlete	Event	V	UB	BB	F	Total	Rank	V	UB	BB	F	Total	Rank
Viktoriia Ivanenko	Individual all-around	12.500	11.500	9.050	10.950	44.000	60	Did not qualify					
Anastasiia Zadvorna	Individual all-around		11.450			DNF		Did not qualify					

== Athletics ==
Men
Track and road events

Athlete	Event	Heat		Semifinal		Final	
Athlete	Event	Result	Rank	Result	Rank	Result	Rank
Andrii Atamaniuk	5,000 m	14:41.26	14 Q	—N/a		15:02.48	4
Mykola Rushchak	20 km walk	—N/a				1:20:10	3rd place, bronze medalist(s)

Field events

Athlete	Event	Qualification		Final	
Athlete	Event	Distance	Position	Distance	Position
Roman Petruk	High jump	2.13	=1 q	NM	—
Illia Bobrovnyk	Pole vault	5.25	14	Did not advance	
Nikita Masliuk	Long jump	7.84	4 q	7.25	11
Danylo Dubyna	Long jump	7.58	13	Did not advance	
Vladyslav Shepeliev	Triple jump	16.45	1 Q	16.21	5
Mykhailo Brudin	Discus throw	58.85	4 q	60.71	3rd place, bronze medalist(s)
Mykhaylo Kokhan	Hammer throw	73.74	2 Q	77.10	1st place, gold medalist(s)

Women
Track and road events

Athlete	Event	Heat		Semifinal		Final	
Athlete	Event	Result	Rank	Result	Rank	Result	Rank
Diana Honcharenko	100 m	11.59	2 Q	11.75	12	Did not advance	
Maryana Shostak	400 m	52.76	4 Q	52.95	10	Did not advance	
Alina Korsunska	800 m	2:06.13	17 q	2:06.34	21	Did not advance	
Svitlana Zhulzhyk	800 m	2:09.03	31	Did not advance			
Alina Kyshkina	100 metres hurdles	13.44	22 Q	DNS		Did not advance	
Valeriya Sholomitska	20 km walk	—N/a				1:36:34	16

Field events

Athlete	Event	Qualification		Final	
Athlete	Event	Distance	Position	Distance	Position
Olha Belchenko	Pole vault	4.20	9 q	4.20	=8
Diana Miroshnichenko	Long jump	6.33	7 q	6.16	9
Viktoriia Baranivska	Triple jump	13.08	9 Q	12.94	9
Alona Chass	Triple jump	12.88	=13	Did not advance	
Sofiya Romasyuk	Shot put	15.38	14	Did not advance	
Olena Khamaza	Hammer throw	62.80	16	Did not advance	

== Badminton ==
Ukraine did not compete in mixed doubles.

Singles and doubles

Athlete	Event	Round of 128	Round of 64	Round of 32	Round of 16	Quarterfinal	Semifinal	Final / BM	
Athlete	Event	Opposition Score	Opposition Score	Opposition Score	Opposition Score	Opposition Score	Opposition Score	Opposition Score	Rank
Vitaliy Reva	Men's singles	Bye	Leal (ESP); L 0–2 (10–15, 10–15)	Did not advance					
Dmytro Shcherbatiuk	Men's singles	Tan (CAN); W 2–0 (15–12, 15–10)	Pradhan (BHU); W 2–0 (15–8, 15–2)	Roy (FRA); L 0–2 (9–15, 7–15)	Did not advance				
Sofiia Lavrova	Women's singles	Bye	Rabie (EGY); W 2–0 (15–4, 15–7)	Teruel (ESP); W 2–0 (15–7, 15–8)	Hoang (CAN); W 2–1 (11–15, 15–9, 15–13)	Kleebyeesun (THA); L 0–2 (12–15, 4–15)	Did not advance		
Anastasiia Alymova	Women's singles	Haber (MLT); W 2–0 (15–11, 15–2)	Chi (USA); L 0–2 (13–15, 11–15)	Did not advance					
Vitaliy Reva; Dmytro Shcherbatiuk	Men's doubles	—N/a	Dulcz / Kiss (HUN); W 2–0 (15–12, 15–12)	Wang / Zhao (AUS); L 1–2 (11–15, 15–11, 15–12)	Did not advance				
Anastasiia Alymova; Sofiia Lavrova	Women's doubles	—N/a	Imaizumi / Kobayashi (JPN); L 0–2 (11–15, 15–17)	Did not advance					

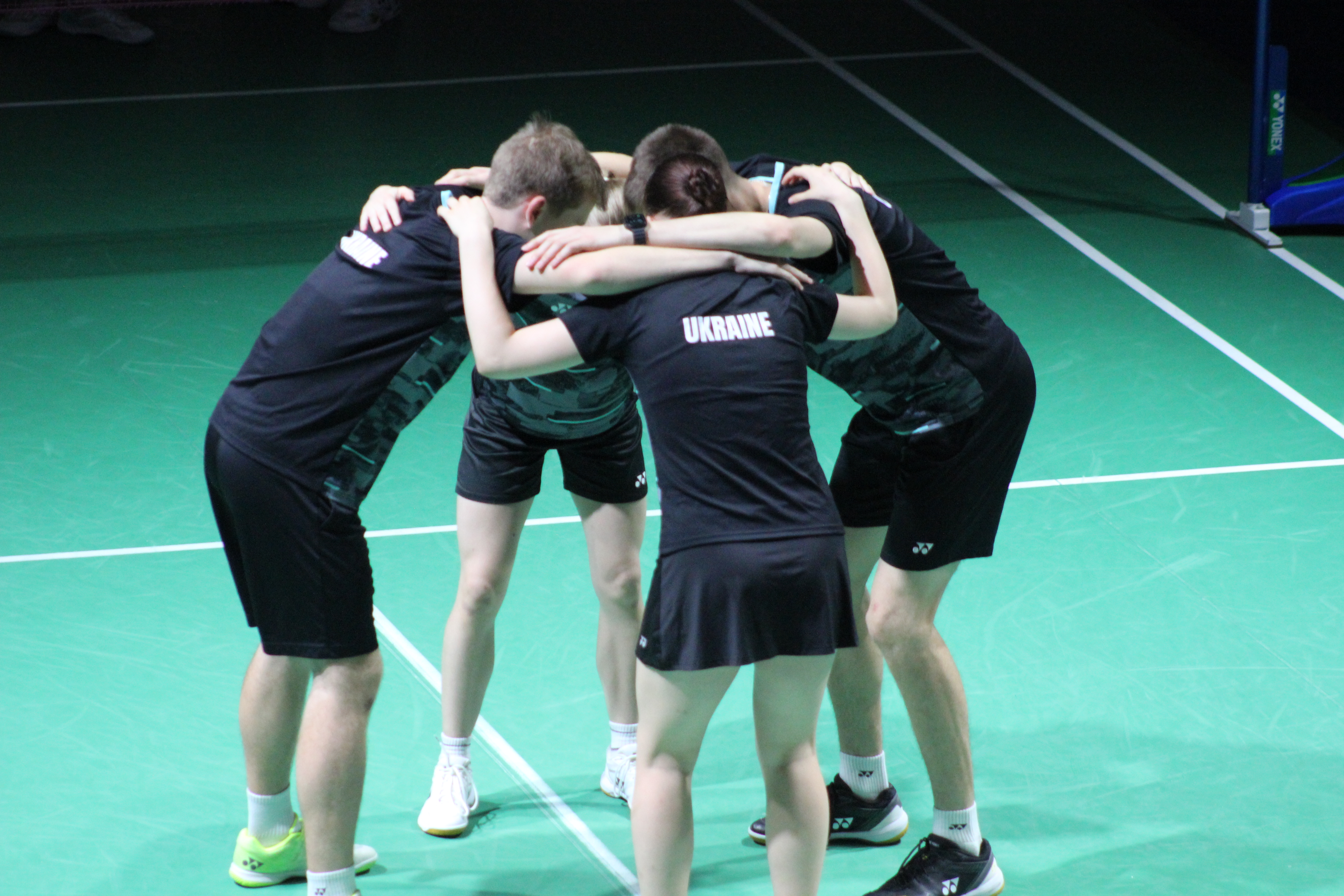
Team Ukraine at the Games

Mixed team

Team	Event	Group stage			Round of 16	Quarterfinals	Semifinals	Final / BM	
Team	Event	Opposition Score	Opposition Score	Rank	Opposition Score	Opposition Score	Opposition Score	Opposition Score	Rank
Vitaliy Reva; Anastasiia Alymova; Dmytro Shcherbatiuk; Sofiia Lavrova	Mixed team	South Korea; L 0–5	Singapore; W 4–1	2 Q	Japan; L 0–3	Spain; L 1–3	Did not advance		=13

- Mixed team games

South Korea
5
Westenergie Sporthalle Court 3
17 July 2025, 12:30 UTC+2

Ukraine
0

			1	2	3
1	(South Korea) (Ukraine)	Jin Yong / Kim Yun-ju; Dmytro Shcherbatiuk / Sofiia Lavrova	15; 9	15; 5
2	(South Korea) (Ukraine)	Park Si-hyun; Vitaliy Reva	15; 5	15; 4
3	(South Korea) (Ukraine)	Lee So-yul; Anastasiia Alymova	15; 7	15; 4
4	(South Korea) (Ukraine)	Kang Geon-hui / Park Seung-min; Vitaliy Reva / Dmytro Shcherbatiuk	15; 7	15; 4
5	(South Korea) (Ukraine)	Kim Chae-jung / Lee Hye-won; Anastasiia Alymova / Sofiia Lavrova	15; 7	15; 6

Singapore
1
Westenergie Sporthalle Court 2
17 July 2025, 19:30 UTC+2

Ukraine
4

			1	2	3
1	(Singapore) (Ukraine)	Darrion Ng / Sabrina Lee; Vitaliy Reva / Anastasiia Alymova	10; 15	10; 15
2	(Singapore) (Ukraine)	Timothy Phang; Dmytro Shcherbatiuk	15; 7	6; 15	9; 15
3	(Singapore) (Ukraine)	Sharifah Danial; Sofiia Lavrova	7; 15	7; 15
4	(Singapore) (Ukraine)	Darrion Ng / Justyn Sim; Vitaliy Reva / Dmytro Shcherbatiuk	15; 7	15; 8
5	(Singapore) (Ukraine)	Sabrina Lee / Grace Tan; Anastasiia Alymova / Sofiia Lavrova	15; 12	10; 15	9; 15

Ukraine
0
Westenergie Sporthalle Court 4
19 July 2025 09:00 UTC+2

Japan
3

			1	2	3
1	(Ukraine) (Japan)	Dmytro Shcherbatiuk / Sofiia Lavrova; Rei Miyashita / Sumire Nakade	9; 15	6; 15
2	(Ukraine) (Japan)	Vitaliy Reva; Kosuke Masumoto	9; 15	10; 15
3	(Ukraine) (Japan)	Anastasiia Alymova; Yuka Kobayashi	7; 15	8; 15
4	(Ukraine) (Japan)	Vitaliy Reva / Dmytro Shcherbatiuk; Shiina Sato / Tsubasa Yoshida				not played
5	(Ukraine) (Japan)	Anastasiia Alymova / Sofiia Lavrova; Mirai Hirose / Suzu Nakahara				not played

Ukraine
1
Westenergie Sporthalle Court 3
19 July 2025 16:00 UTC+2

Spain
3

			1	2	3
1	(Ukraine) (Spain)	Vitaliy Reva / Anastasiia Alymova; Daniel Franco / Carmen Jiménez	14; 16	16; 18
2	(Ukraine) (Spain)	Dmytro Shcherbatiuk; Álvaro Leal	15; 8	5; 15	9; 15
3	(Ukraine) (Spain)	Sofiia Lavrova; Ana Ramírez	15; 8	15; 7
4	(Ukraine) (Spain)	Vitaliy Reva / Dmytro Shcherbatiuk; Daniel Franco / Carlos Piris	9; 15	7; 15
5	(Ukraine) (Spain)	Anastasiia Alymova / Sofiia Lavrova; Nikol Carulla / Carmen Jiménez				not played

== Diving ==
Men

Athlete	Event	Preliminary		Final	
Athlete	Event	Points	Rank	Points	Rank
Maksym Mirza	1 m springboard	286.85	14 Q	284.55	10
Kyrylo Azarov	1 m springboard	270.25	16 r	Did not advance	
Kyrylo Azarov	3 m springboard	385.20	8 Q	360.75	10
Maksym Mirza	3 m springboard	352.00	14 Q	327.90	12
Yevhen Naumenko	3 m springboard	336.65	18	Did not advance	
Kyrylo Azarov; Maksym Mirza	3 m synchronized springboard	—N/a		341.55	5
Danylo Avanesov	10 m platform	379.80	4 Q	398.85	4
Marko Barsukov	10 m platform	375.70	5 Q	366.40	6
Danylo Avanesov; Marko Barsukov	10 m synchronized platform	—N/a		376.83	5
Kyrylo Azarov; Maksym Mirza; Danylo Avanesov; Marko Barsukov; Yevhen Naumenko	Team classification	—N/a		Outside of top 3	

== Fencing ==
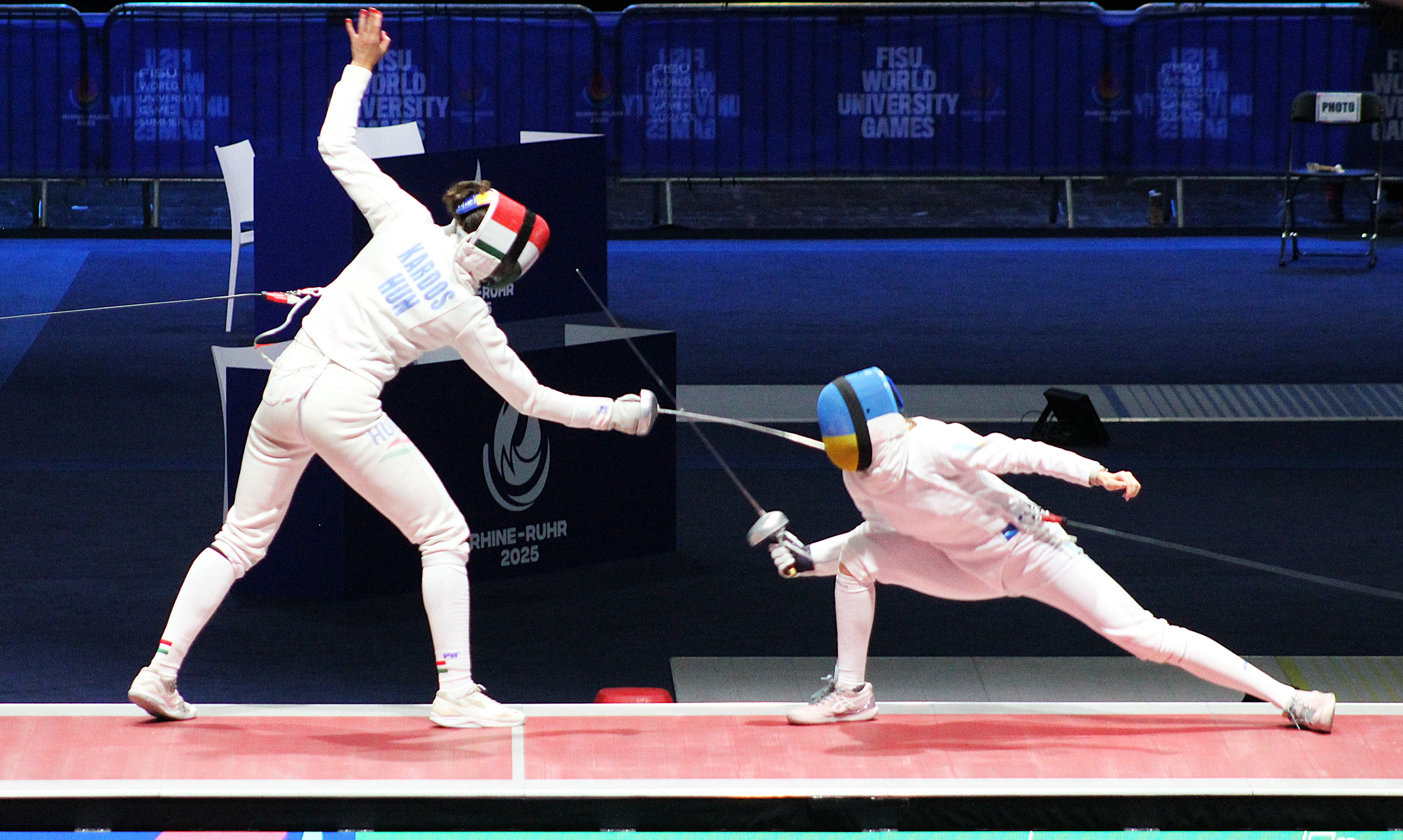
Anna Maksymenko and Edina Kardos in the semifinal

Athlete	Event	Round of 128	Round of 64	Round of 32	Round of 16	Quarterfinal	Semifinal	Final / BM	
Athlete	Event	Opposition Score	Opposition Score	Opposition Score	Opposition Score	Opposition Score	Opposition Score	Opposition Score	Rank
Mykhailo Krasniuk	Men's épée	Bye	Bester (RSA); W 15–12	Ghivoly (ISR); W 15–9	Fuhrimann (SUI); W 15–14	Shvelidze (AIN); L 14–15	Did not advance		
Andrii Opanasenko	Men's épée	Bye	Alakkas (KSA); W 15–10	Somody (HUN); L 10–15	Did not advance				
Pavlo Trofymenko	Men's épée	Pieper (NED); W 14–13	Asami (JPN); L 10–15	Did not advance					
Maksym Perchuk	Men's épée	Did not qualify							
Mykhailo Krasniuk; Andrii Opanasenko; Pavlo Trofymenko; Maksym Perchuk	Team épée	—N/a	—N/a	Australia; W 45–24	Poland; W 45–38	Japan; L 39–45	Individual Neutral Athletes; L 23–45	Saudi Arabia; W 45–42	7
Yevhen Lazarenko	Men's foil	—N/a	Fukuda (JPN); W 15–14	Chen (TPE); L 12–15	Did not advance				
Yaroslav Muruhin	Men's foil	—N/a	Choi (KOR); W 15–10	Martini (ITA); L 14–15	Did not advance				
Andrii Cherkashyn	Men's foil	—N/a	Choi (KOR); L 8–15	Did not advance					
Ivan Ilyashev	Men's foil	Did not qualify							
Yevhen Lazarenko; Yaroslav Muruhin; Andrii Cherkashyn; Ivan Ilyashev	Team foil	—N/a	—N/a	Hungary; L 37–44	Did not advance				
Anna Maksymenko	Women's épée	Bye	Goldmann (GER); W 15–10	Löhr (GER); W 15–12	Zittel (GER); W 15–9	Vandingenen (BEL); W 15–13	Kardos (HUN); W 15–12	Hsieh (HKG); L 8–9	2nd place, silver medalist(s)
Emily Conrad	Women's épée	Bye	Hecht (ISR); W 15–11	Wu (TPE); W 15–10	Zittel (ISR); W 14–11	Francillonne (FRA); W 15–7	Hsieh (HKG); L 8–10	Did not advance	3rd place, bronze medalist(s)
Polina Kuleshova	Women's épée	Bye	Zittel (ISR); L 12–15	Did not advance					
Sofiia Sidenko	Women's épée	Lai (HKG); L 9–15	Did not advance						
Anna Maksymenko; Emily Conrad; Polina Kuleshova; Sofiia Sidenko	Team épée	—N/a	—N/a	Bye	Azerbaijan; W 45–28	South Korea; L 38–43	Japan; W 45–36	Hungary; W 45–33	5
Viktoriia Horpenchenko	Women's foil	—N/a	Bye	Wasilczuk (POL); L 11–15	Did not advance				

== Judo ==
Men

Athlete	Event	Round of 64	Round of 32	Round of 16	Quarterfinals	Semifinals	Final	
Athlete	Event	Opposition Result	Opposition Result	Opposition Result	Opposition Result	Opposition Result	Opposition Result	Rank
Serhii Kim	−60 kg	—N/a	Cargnelli (FRA); W 001–000	Naji (HUN); L 000–102	Did not advance			
Mykyta Holoborodko	−66 kg	Bye	Yoon (KOR); W 110–010	Talibov (AZE); W 110–011	Christodoulides (CYP); L 001–100	Gaprindashvili (GEO); W 020–001	Serikbayev (KAZ); L 000–020	=5
Serhii Nebotov	−73 kg	—N/a	González Guillén (ECU); W 010–000	Szabó (HUN); L 000–001	Did not advance			
Vladyslav Kolobov	−81 kg	—N/a	García San Rafael (ESP); W 110–000	Oulevey (SUI); W 010–001	Dvalashvili (GEO); L 010–011	Tóth (HUN); L 000–100	Did not advance	=7
Marat Kryzhanivkyi	−90 kg	—N/a	Santamaría (ESP); L 000–020	Did not advance				
Oleksii Yershov	−100 kg	—N/a	Dezani Arévalo (BRA); L 000–001	Did not advance				
Yevheniy Balyevskyy	+100 kg	—N/a	Bye	Gustan (FRA); W 021–010	Zholdoshkaziev (KGZ); W 001–000	Inaneishvili (GEO); L 000–100	Antoniou (CYP); L 000–100	=5

Women

Athlete	Event	Round of 32	Round of 16	Quarterfinals	Semifinals	Final	
Athlete	Event	Opposition Result	Opposition Result	Opposition Result	Opposition Result	Opposition Result	Rank
Anastasiia Sykish	−48 kg	Sarantuya (MGL); L 000–001	Did not advance				
Marharyta Miroshnichenko	−52 kg	Fukunaga (JPN); L 000–110	Did not advance				
Inna Shynkarenko	−57 kg	Siennicka (POL); L 001–020	Did not advance				
Sofia Bordinskikh	−63 kg	Bye	Fazliu (KOS); L 000–002	Did not advance			
Olha Tsimko	−70 kg	Khaidem (IND); W 100–000	Maeda (JPN); L 000–020	Did not advance			
Anna Kazakova	−78 kg	Sugimura (JPN); L 000–100	Did not advance				

Mixed team

Athlete	Category	Round of 32	Round of 16	Quarterfinals	Semifinals	Final	
Athlete	Category	Opposition Result	Opposition Result	Opposition Result	Opposition Result	Opposition Result	Rank
Mykyta Holoborodko; Serhii Nebotov; Vladyslav Kolobov; Marat Kryzhanivkyi; Oleksii Yershov; Yevheniy Balyevskyy; Marharyta Miroshnichenko; Inna Shynkarenko; Sofia Bordinskikh; Olha Tsimko; Anna Kazakova	Mixed team	Austria; W 4–2	Brazil; L 2–4	Did not advance			

- Ukraine vs. Austria
  - Anna Kazakova 000-100 Jael Wernert
  - Yevheniy Balyevskyy 101-000 Vilmos Lennert
  - Inna Shynkarenko 000-001 Laura Kallinger
  - Serhii Nebotov 100-000 Marcus Auer
  - Olha Tsimko 100-000 Lisa Grabner
  - Marat Kryzhanivkyi 100–000 Leon Gümüskaya
- Ukraine vs. Brazil
  - Yevheniy Balyevskyy 002-000 Gabriel Dezani Arévalo
  - Inna Shynkarenko 000-101 Beatriz Rosa Comanche
  - Serhii Nebotov 000-002 Guilherme Castro de Oliveira
  - Olha Tsimko 000-001 Luana Oliveira de Carvahlo
  - Marat Kryzhanivkyi 100-011 Luan Carlos Costa de Almeida
  - Anna Kazakova 000–100 Beatriz Freitas

== Rhythmic gymnastics ==
Marta Borys competed at her second consecutive Games and won three more medals which she added to her two medals from 2023.

Individual all-round

Athlete	Event	Hoop	Ball	Clubs	Ribbon	Total	Rank
Polina Horodnycha	All-around	25.500	25.200	26.050	26.150	102.900	9
Khrystyna Pohranychna	All-around	25.350	24.950	26.450	24.650	101.400	14

Individual apparatus

Athlete	Event	Qualification		Final	
Athlete	Event	Total	Rank	Total	Rank
Polina Horodnycha	Hoop	25.500	16	DNQ	
Polina Horodnycha	Ball	25.200	17	DNQ	
Polina Horodnycha	Clubs	26.050	9 r	DNQ	
Polina Horodnycha	Ribbon	26.150	6 Q	25.650	7
Khrystyna Pohranychna	Hoop	25.350	19	DNQ	
Khrystyna Pohranychna	Ball	24.950	18	DNQ	
Khrystyna Pohranychna	Clubs	26.450	7 Q	25.000	8
Khrystyna Pohranychna	Ribbon	24.650	15	DNQ	

Group all-round

Athletes	Event	5 ribbons	3 balls + 2 hoops	Total	Rank
Valeriia Panchenko; Kateryna Hrachova; Emiliia Lavrynets; Daniela Chebatarova; Marta Borys; Bohdana Melnyk	All-around	20.050	24.400	44.450	2nd place, silver medalist(s)

Group separate programms

Athletes	Event	Qualification		Final	
Athletes	Event	Total	Rank	Total	Rank
Valeriia Panchenko; Kateryna Hrachova; Emiliia Lavrynets; Daniela Chebatarova; Marta Borys; Bohdana Melnyk	5 ribbons	20.050	2 Q	20.300	2nd place, silver medalist(s)
Valeriia Panchenko; Kateryna Hrachova; Emiliia Lavrynets; Daniela Chebatarova; Marta Borys; Bohdana Melnyk	3 Balls + 2 Hoops	24.400	2 Q	24.100	1st place, gold medalist(s)

== Rowing ==
Athlete	Event	Heats		Quarterfinals		Semifinals		Final	
Athlete	Event	Time	Rank	Time	Rank	Time	Rank	Time	Rank
Yan Kamanov	Men's single sculls	7:47.83	26 FE	Did not advance				7:33.13	26
Danil Binder; Oleksandr Shchepochkin	Men's coxless pair	7:52.99	20 FD	—N/a		Did not advance		8:19.41	20
Yukhym Patlaienko; Yevhenii Kuleba	Men's double sculls	7:16.78	20 FD	—N/a		Did not advance		7:24.54	22
Viktoriia Savenkova; Anastasiia Kozyr	Women's double sculls	8:22.27	16 FC	—N/a		Did not advance		7:50.53	16
Valeriia Kultenko; Bohdan Melnyk; Karyna Karpenko; Oleksandr Kulykov	Mixed quadruple sculls	6:50.68	10 FB	—N/a				7:20.72	11

Qualification Legend: FA=Final A (medal); FB=Final B (non-medal); FC=Final C (non-medal); FD=Final D (non-medal); FE=Final E (non-medal); SA/B=Semifinals A/B; QF=Quarterfinals

== Swimming ==
Men

Athlete	Event	Heat		Semifinal		Final	
Athlete	Event	Time	Rank	Time	Rank	Time	Rank
Illia Linnyk	50 m freestyle	22.30	4 Q	22.08	3 Q	22.10	4
Illia Linnyk	100 m freestyle	49.40	9 Q	49.16	9	Did not advance	
Illia Linnyk	200 m freestyle	1:50.27	122	Did not advance			
Heorhii Lukashev	400 m freestyle	3:54.88	15	—N/a		Did not advance	
Vadym Naumenko	50 m backstroke	26.82	34	Did not advance			
Vadym Naumenko	200 m backstroke	2:02.39	19	Did not advance			
Ihor Troianovskyi	50 m butterfly	24.10	=15 Q	23.71	5 Q	23.87	8
Vadym Naumenko	50 m butterfly	24.40	27	Did not advance			
Ihor Troianovskyi	100 m butterfly	52.89	13 Q	52.32	7 Q	52.36	8
Vadym Naumenko	100 m butterfly	53.72	21	Did not advance			
Ihor Troianovskyi	200 m butterfly	1:58.62	9 Q	1:59.09	15	Did not advance	
Heorhii Lukashev	200 m butterfly	1:59.62	16 Q	1:58.71	14	Did not advance	
Vadym Naumenko	200 m individual medley	2:00.98	9 Q	2:01.42	11	Did not advance	
Heorhii Lukashev	400 m individual medley	4:21.28	6 Q	—N/a		4:18.99	5

Women

Athlete	Event	Heat		Semifinal		Final	
Athlete	Event	Time	Rank	Time	Rank	Time	Rank
Nika Sharafutdinova	50 m backstroke	28.83	10 Q	28.79	9	Did not advance	
Nika Sharafutdinova	100 m backstroke	1:01.64	9 Q	1:01.92	14	Did not advance	
Nika Sharafutdinova	200 m backstroke	2:17.12	19	Did not advance			

== Taekwondo ==
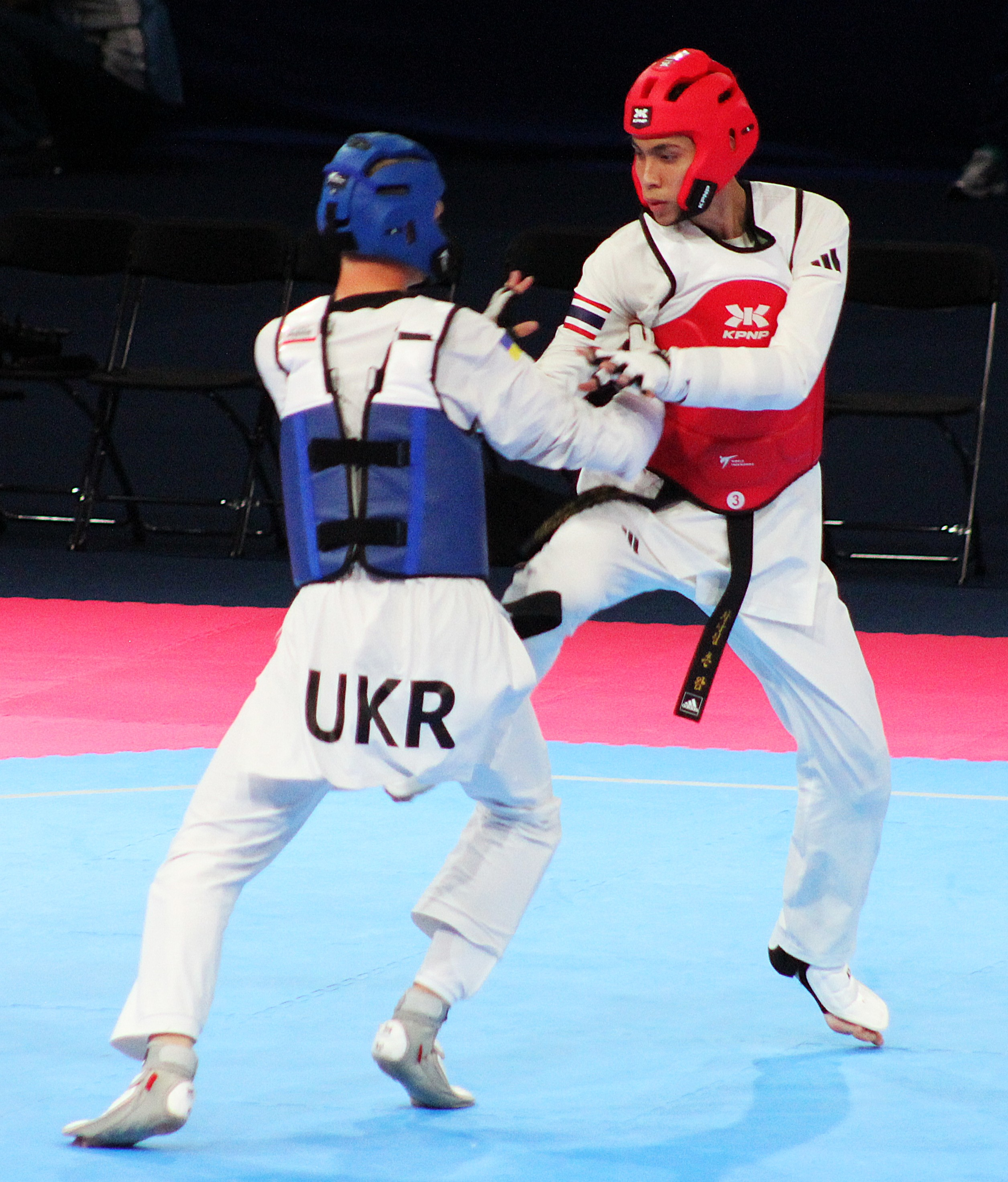
Maksym Manenkov and Sirawit Mahamad in the final bout

Ukrainian athletes competed in kyorugi events only. The national team achieved its best performance in taekwondo at the Games. Andrii Harbar won his second consecutive bronze medal at the Summer World University Games.

Men

Athlete	Event	Round of 32	Round of 16	Quarterfinals	Semifinals	Final	
Athlete	Event	Opposition Result	Opposition Result	Opposition Result	Opposition Result	Opposition Result	Rank
Maksym Manenkov	−58 kg	Bye	Lopes (POR); W 2–0	Pan (TPE); W 2–1	Tleules (KAZ); W 2–0	Mahamad (THA); W 2–1	1st place, gold medalist(s)
Ivan Krasnoholovets	−63 kg	Papierowski (POL); L 0–2	Did not advance				
Volodymyr Bystrov	−68 kg	Turabov (UZB); W 2–0	Erer (TUR); L 1–2	Did not advance			
Oleh Mamatov	−74 kg	Korpe (TUR); L 1–2	Did not advance				
Kyrylo Hurnov	−80 kg	Bye	Alipour (GBR); W 2–0	Suleimanov (AZE); W 2–0	Hung (TPE); L 0–2	Did not advance	3rd place, bronze medalist(s)
Artem Harbar	−87 kg	Bye	Soumano (MLI); W 2–0	Gafarov (AZE); W 2–0	Rodriguez (USA); W 2–0	Piatkowski (POL); W 2–0	1st place, gold medalist(s)
Andrii Harbar	+87 kg	Bye	Buidze (GEO); W 2–1	Krystian (POL); W 2–1	Mavlonov (UZB); L 0–2	Did not advance	3rd place, bronze medalist(s)
Maksym Manenkov; Artem Harbar; Kyrylo Hurnov	Team kyorugi	Bye	Azerbaijan; W 2–0	France; L 1–2	Did not advance		

Women

Athlete	Event	Round of 32	Round of 16	Quarterfinals	Semifinals	Final	
Athlete	Event	Opposition Result	Opposition Result	Opposition Result	Opposition Result	Opposition Result	Rank
Erika Bryhida	−49 kg	Kry (CAM); W 2–0	Matonti (ITA); W DSQ	Seeken (THA); L 0–2	Did not advance		
Sofiia Khobtar	−53 kg	Chhun (CAM); W 2–1	Sundetbay (KAZ); L 0–2	Did not advance			
Daria Kostenevych	−57 kg	Stacy (KEN); W 2–0	al Halwani (ITA); L 0–2	Did not advance			
Anna Anastasova	−62 kg	Premraj (IND); W 2–1	Tongchan (THA); L 0–2	Did not advance			
Diana Krush	−67 kg	Khussainova (KAZ); L 0–2	Did not advance				
Renata Podolian	−73 kg	—N/a	Mastelić (CRO); W 2–0	Oh (KOR); L 1–2	Did not advance		
Mariia Kuts	+73 kg	Bye	Hamadache (FRA); L 0–2	Did not advance			
Daria Kostenevych; Mariia Kuts; Sofiia Khobtar	Team kyorugi	India; W 2–0	China; L 0–2	Did not advance			

Mixed

Athlete	Event	Round of 16	Quarterfinals	Semifinals	Final	
Athlete	Event	Opposition Result	Opposition Result	Opposition Result	Opposition Result	Rank
Oleh Mamatov; Renata Podolian; Erika Bryhida; Volodymyr Bystrov	Team kyorugi	Egypt; L 0–2	Did not advance			
