= Judo at the 2025 Summer World University Games – Men's 81 kg =

Men's 81 kg at the 2025 Summer World University Games
- Venue: Messe Essen
- Location: Essen
- Dates: 24 July
- Competitors: 31

Medalists
| gold medal | Kaito Amano | Japan |
| silver medal | Zaur Dvalashvili | Georgia |
| bronze medal | Lee Joon-hwan | South Korea |
| bronze medal | Petr Mladý | Czech Republic |

The men's 81 kg at the 2025 Summer World University Games in Rhine-Ruhr, Germany was held 24 July 2025. Kaito Amano of Japan captured the gold medal. Zaur Dvalashvili of Georgia took home the silver medal. The bronze medals were awarded to Lee Joon-hwan of South Korea and Petr Mladý of Czech Republic.

== Schedule ==
All times are Central European Time (UTC+1)

| Date | Time | Event |
|---|---|---|
| 24 July 2015 | 10:00 | Preliminary Rounds |
| 24 July 2015 | 17:00 | Final Block |

== Results ==
Athletes advanced through direct knockout rounds—including the round of 32, round of 16, quarterfinals, and semifinals—to determine the two finalists fighting for the gold and silver medals. Parallel to the main bracket, a repechage system allowed defeated quarterfinalists to work their way back into the tournament, culminating in two separate bronze medal matches where the repechage winners faced the losing semifinalists.

Round of 32
V Sharma (IND) | 000
Lao IC (MAC) | 100
K Amano (JPN) | 100
R Kaunsatan (THA) | 000
D Szulik (POL) | 100
Pang JC (SGP) | 000
P Pelivan (MDA) | 001
N Mavlonberdiev (UZB) | 010
S van Suilen (NED) | 111
D Škultéty (SVK) | 000 (yellow card)
A Kumisbay (KAZ) | 102
A Tetino (POR) | 001
P Mlády (CZE) | 020 (yellow card)
M Tahir (PAK) | 001
Z Dvalashvili (GEO) | 001
O Georgakis (CYP) | 000
A Salamar (ECU) | 000
Y El-Saikaly (LBN) | 101
V Kolobov (UKR) | 110
M García (ESP) | 000
T Oulevey (SUI) | 100
L Guemueskaya (AUT) | 000
L Almeida (BRA) | 000
B Tóth (HUN) | 100 (yellow card)
M Parlati (ITA) | 100
M Abbasov (AZE) | 000
J Silot (USA) | 100
L Slamberger (GER) | 000
K Batbayar (MGL) | 001 (yellow card)
M Hebib (BIH) | 100 (yellow card)

Round of 16
Lee Jh (KOR) | 100
Lao IC (MAC) | 000
K Amano (JPN) | 100 (yellow card)
D Szulik (POL) | 000 (yellow card)
N Mavlonberdiev (UZB) | 001 (yellow card)
S van Suilen (NED) | 000
A Kumisbay (KAZ) | 000 (yellow card)
P Mlády (CZE) | 010 (yellow card)
Z Dvalashvili (GEO) | 020
Y El-Saikaly (LBN) | 000
V Kolobov (UKR) | 010 (yellow card)
T Oulevey (SUI) | 001 (yellow card)
B Tóth (HUN) | 010
M Parlati (ITA) | 001 (yellow card)
J Silot (USA) | 100 (yellow card)
M Hebib (BIH) | 000

Quarter-finals
Lee Jh (KOR) | 000
K Amano (JPN) | 100
N Mavlonberdiev (UZB) | 000
P Mlády (CZE) | 001 (yellow card)
Z Dvalashvili (GEO) | 011
V Kolobov (UKR) | 010 (yellow card)
B Tóth (HUN) | 000 (yellow card)
J Silot (USA) | 001 (yellow card)

Semi-finals
K Amano (JPN) | 100
P Mlády (CZE) | 000
Z Dvalashvili (GEO) | 110
J Silot (USA) | 000

Final
K Amano (JPN) | 001 (yellow card)
Z Dvalashvili (GEO) | 000 (yellow card)

Repechage Phases

Repechage
Lee Jh (KOR) | 100
N Mavlonberdiev (UZB) | 000
V Kolobov (UKR) | 000
B Tóth (HUN) | 100

Bronze medal
Lee Jh (KOR) | 100
J Silot (USA) | 000
B Tóth (HUN) | 000 (yellow card)
P Mlády (CZE) | 001 (yellow card)
