= Swimming at the 2025 Summer World University Games – Men's 100 metre butterfly =

Men's 100 metre butterfly at the 2025 Summer World University Games
- Venue: Schwimm- und Sprunghalle im Europasportpark
- Location: Berlin
- Dates: 21 July (heats and semifinals); 22 July (final)
- Competitors: 59 from 39 nations

Medalists
gold medal	Gianmarco Sansone	Italy
silver medal	Björn Kammann	Germany
bronze medal	Eldorbek Usmonov	Uzbekistan

The men's 100 metre butterfly at the 2025 Summer World University Games in Rhine-Ruhr, Germany was held from 21 to 22 July 2025. Gianmarco Sansone from Italy won the gold medal, Björn Kammann from Germany took the silver medal and Eldorbek Usmonov from Uzbekistan earned the bronze medal.

== Schedule ==
All times are Central European Time (UTC+1)

Date	Time	Round
21 July	09:00	Heats
21 July	20:36	Semifinals
22 July	19:00	Final

== Records ==
Prior to the competition, the world and Universiade records were as follows.

Category	Swimmer	Record	Date	Place	Event
World record	(United States) Caeleb Dressel	49.45	31 July 2021	Tokyo, Japan	2020 Summer Olympics
Universiade record	(Kenya) Jason Dunford	50.85	9 Jul 2009	Belgrade, Serbia	2009 Summer Universiade

== Results ==
=== Heats ===
All entered athletes competed across multiple seeded heats in the morning session. Swimmers with the top 16 fastest times advanced, regardless of which individual heat they swam.

Rank	Heat	Lane	Swimmer	Nation	Time	Notes
1	7	4	Björn Kammann	Germany	51.94	Q
2	7	2	Ole Eidam	Germany	52.12	Q
3	6	5	Adrian Jaśkiewicz	Poland	52.32	Q
4	8	6	Thomas Nankervis	Australia	52.52	Q
5	6	7	Eldorbek Usmonov	Uzbekistan	52.62	Q
6	8	4	Kamal Muhammad	United States	52.66	Q
7	8	5	Matthew Klinge	United States	52.67	Q
8	7	5	Riku Kitagawa	Japan	52.71	Q
9	8	3	Wang Kuan-hung	Chinese Taipei	52.73	Q
10	6	4	Gianmarco Sansone	Italy	52.80	Q
11	7	3	Patrick Hussey	Canada	52.82	Q
12	7	6	Michele Busa	Italy	52.86	Q
13	7	7	Ihor Troianovskyi	Ukraine	52.89	Q
14	6	6	Kim Ji-hun	South Korea	52.91	Q
15	8	2	Pedro Souza	Brazil	52.99	Q
16	8	1	Ruard van Renen	South Africa	53.27	Q
17	8	8	Andreas Rizek	Austria	53.28	
18	7	1	Sebastian Luňák	Czech Republic	53.67	
19	8	7	Brodie Gordon-Gibson	Great Britain	53.69	
20	6	3	Gustavo Saldo	Brazil	53.70	
21	4	5	Vadym Naumenko	Ukraine	53.72	
22	4	6	Benedicton Manickaraj	India	53.85	
23	5	4	Anton Kocsu	Hungary	53.98	
23	6	1	Benjamin Loewen	Canada	53.98	
25	5	3	Elías Ardiles	Chile	54.08	
26	1	5	Abdurrahman Rustamov	Azerbaijan	54.17	
26	6	8	Noah Retzler	Switzerland	54.17	
28	5	5	Robin Yeboah	Switzerland	54.20	
29	4	4	Paweł Uryniuk	Poland	54.21	
30	5	2	Rishat Zhumagulov	Kazakhstan	54.30	
31	1	4	Ramil Valizada	Azerbaijan	54.34	
32	7	8	Ng Cheuk Yin	Hong Kong	54.45	
33	5	7	Artur Tobler	Estonia	54.51	
34	6	2	Bryan Leong	Malaysia	54.52	
35	5	1	Keigo Fukuda	Japan	54.60	
36	5	6	Polat Turnali	Turkey	54.79	
37	5	8	Guy Brooks	South Africa	54.93	
38	4	1	Oliver Gray	Slovakia	55.87	
39	4	3	Ephraim Tan	Singapore	55.88	
40	4	7	Jaka Pusnik	Slovenia	55.95	
41	3	4	Harsh Saroha	India	56.05	
42	4	8	Nicolas Retrive	Argentina	56.38	
43	4	2	Brandon Yap	Singapore	56.57	
44	2	4	Oliver Kuulpak	Estonia	57.27	
45	2	8	Agustin Rasche	Argentina	57.31	
46	3	6	Staņislavs Šakels	Latvia	57.58	
47	3	3	Sandev Senaratna	Sri Lanka	57.82	
48	3	2	Abdulazizbek Abdumajidov	Uzbekistan	57.86	
49	2	3	Radoslav Polčič	Slovakia	58.10	
50	3	5	Belgudei Uyanga	Mongolia	58.23	
51	3	1	Giorgi Koiava	Georgia	59.43	
52	3	8	Martín Álvarez	Ecuador	59.65	
53	2	5	Nicolas Bobadilla	Chile	1:00.77	
54	2	7	Lei Hoi Man	Macau	1:00.78	
55	2	1	Nasser Al-Kindi	Oman	1:03.22	
56	1	3	Maksimilians Vegeris	Latvia	1:04.06	
57	2	2	Sameer Asif	Pakistan	1:07.45	
—	2	6	Bjourn Mhlanga	Zimbabwe	DNS	
—	3	7	Steven Jaramillo	Ecuador	DNS	

=== Semifinals ===
The 16 advancing swimmers were split into two semifinal heats of 8 during the evening session. The swimmers recording the top 8 fastest times advanced to the final round.

Rank	Heat	Lane	Swimmer	Nation	Time	Notes
1	1	7	Michele Busa	Italy	51.52	Q
2	1	4	Ole Eidam	Germany	52.03	Q
3	1	2	Gianmarco Sansone	Italy	52.07	Q
4	1	1	Kim Ji-hun	South Korea	52.20	Q
5	2	4	Björn Kammann	Germany	52.24	Q
6	2	3	Eldorbek Usmonov	Uzbekistan	52.30	Q
7	2	1	Ihor Troianovskyi	Ukraine	52.32	Q
8	2	2	Wang Kuan-hung	Chinese Taipei	52.35	Q
9	1	5	Thomas Nankervis	Australia	52.36	
9	1	3	Kamal Muhammad	United States	52.36	
11	2	7	Patrick Hussey	Canada	52.43	
12	2	5	Adrian Jaśkiewicz	Poland	52.48	
13	2	6	Matthew Klinge	United States	52.71	
14	2	8	Pedro Souza	Brazil	53.10	
15	1	6	Riku Kitagawa	Japan	53.16	
16	1	8	Ruard van Renen	South Africa	55.14	

=== Final ===
The fastest 8 swimmers competed in a single race to determine the gold, silver and bronze medalists.

Rank	Lane	Swimmer	Nation	Time	Notes
1st place, gold medalist(s)	3	Gianmarco Sansone	Italy	51.40	
2nd place, silver medalist(s)	2	Björn Kammann	Germany	51.70	
3rd place, bronze medalist(s)	7	Eldorbek Usmonov	Uzbekistan	51.84	
4	4	Michele Busa	Italy	52.06	
5	8	Wang Kuan-hung	Chinese Taipei	52.18	
6	5	Ole Eidam	Germany	52.31	
6	6	Kim Ji-hun	South Korea	52.31	
8	1	Ihor Troianovskyi	Ukraine	52.36	
