= Rowing at the 2025 Summer World University Games – Men's single sculls =

Men's single sculls at the 2025 Summer World University Games
- Venue: Regattabahn Duisburg
- Location: Duisburg
- Dates: 25 July (heats, quarterfinals); 26 July (semifinals, finals B—E); 27 July (final A)
- Competitors: 29 from 29 nations

Medalists
| gold medal | Ivan Corșunov | Moldova |
| silver medal | Joshua Knight | Great Britain |
| bronze medal | Arnedas Kelmelis | Lithuania |

The men's single sculls at the 2025 Summer World University Games in Rhine-Ruhr, Germany was held from 25 to 27 July 2025. Ivan Corșunov from Moldova won the gold medal, Joshua Knight from Great Britain earned the silver medal and Arnedas Kelmelis from Lithuania took the bronze medal.

== Schedule ==
All times are Central European Time (UTC+1)

| Date | Time | Round |
|---|---|---|
| 25 July 2025 | 9:42 | Heats |
| 25 July 2025 | 15:00 | Quarterfinals |
| 26 July 2025 | 8:30 | Semifinals |
| 26 July 2025 | 13:16 | Final E |
| 26 July 2025 | 13:24 | Final D |
| 26 July 2025 | 13:32 | Final C |
| 26 July 2025 | 13:40 | Final B |
| 27 July 2025 | 10:50 | Final A |

== Results ==
=== Heats ===
The two fastest boats in each heat and the fourteen fastest times advanced directly to the quarterfinals. The remaining boats were sent to the final E.

==== Heat 1 ====
| Rank | Rower | Country | Time | Notes |
|---|---|---|---|---|
| 1 | Ivan Corșunov | Moldova | 7:14.88 | Q |
| 2 | Jonas Gelsen | Germany | 7:22.03 | Q |
| 3 | Marek Diblík | Czech Republic | 7:24.38 | Q |
| 4 | Savin Rodenburg | Belgium | 7:25.84 | Q |
| 5 | Nicolai Haraldseth | Norway | 7:31.95 | Q |
| 6 | Yan Kamanov | Ukraine | 7:47.83 | FE |

==== Heat 2 ====
| Rank | Rower | Country | Time | Notes |
|---|---|---|---|---|
| 1 | Percijn van Haeringen | Netherlands | 7:12.31 | Q |
| 2 | Maksim Zhevlachenko | Individual Neutral Athletes | 7:14.26 | Q |
| 3 | Narongsak Naksaeng | Thailand | 7:19.18 | Q |
| 4 | Bapan Askhanbek | Kazakhstan | 7:20.69 | Q |
| 5 | Rikuto Sugawara | Japan | 7:22.61 | Q |
| 6 | Nathan Damas | United States | 7:56.77 | FE |

==== Heat 3 ====
| Rank | Rower | Country | Time | Notes |
|---|---|---|---|---|
| 1 | Arnedas Kelmelis | Lithuania | 7:11.31 | Q |
| 2 | Mehrojbek Mamatkulov | Uzbekistan | 7:14.18 | Q |
| 3 | Arie Rasmussen Magasiva | New Zealand | 7:15.59 | Q |
| 4 | Jakub Herhonek | Slovakia | 7:22.25 | Q |
| 5 | Lee Jui-che | Chinese Taipei | 7:34.88 | Q |
| 6 | Nurlan Pashayev | Azerbaijan | 7:38.53 | Q |

==== Heat 4 ====
| Rank | Rower | Country | Time | Notes |
|---|---|---|---|---|
| 1 | Bojan Reuffurth | Switzerland | 7:11.12 | Q |
| 2 | Cezary Litka | Poland | 7:15.61 | Q |
| 3 | Giovanni Borgonovo | Italy | 7:23.02 | Q |
| 4 | Nicholas Szigeter | Australia | 7:28.08 | Q |
| 5 | Alexander Jurado | Spain | 7:44.53 | FE |
| 6 | Pratik Gupta | India | 8:03.29 | FE |

==== Heat 5 ====
| Rank | Rower | Country | Time | Notes |
|---|---|---|---|---|
| 1 | Joshua Knight | Great Britain | 7:13.73 | Q |
| 2 | Konrad Hultsch | Austria | 7:17.75 | Q |
| 3 | Charles-Étienne Tabet | Canada | 7:23.23 | Q |
| 4 | Balázs Szöllősi | Hungary | 7:37.16 | Q |
| 5 | Seo Sung-woo | South Korea | 8:10.10 | FE |

=== Quarterfinals ===
The three fastest boats in each heat advanced directly to the quarterfinals. The six fastest times advanced to the final C. The remaining boats were sent to the final D.

==== Quarterfinal 1 ====
| Rank | Rower | Country | Time | Notes |
|---|---|---|---|---|
| 1 | Ivan Corșunov | Moldova | 7:29.31 | Q |
| 2 | Cezary Litka | Poland | 7:32.04 | Q |
| 3 | Giovanni Borgonovo | Italy | 7:32.11 | Q |
| 4 | Mehrojbek Mamatkulov | Uzbekistan | 7:42.37 | FC |
| 5 | Charles-Étienne Tabet | Canada | 7:44.35 | FC |
| 6 | Nurlan Pashayev | Azerbaijan | 8:07.00 | FD |

==== Quarterfinal 2 ====
| Rank | Rower | Country | Time | Notes |
|---|---|---|---|---|
| 1 | Konrad Hultsch | Austria | 7:22.23 | Q |
| 2 | Maksim Zhevlachenko | Individual Neutral Athletes | 7:23.83 | Q |
| 3 | Percijn van Haeringen | Netherlands | 7:29.73 | Q |
| 4 | Balázs Szöllősi | Hungary | 7:38.19 | FC |
| 5 | Marek Diblík | Czech Republic | 7:41.04 | FC |
| 6 | Rikuto Sugawara | Japan | 7:43.91 | FC |

==== Quarterfinal 3 ====
| Rank | Rower | Country | Time | Notes |
|---|---|---|---|---|
| 1 | Jonas Gelsen | Germany | 7:43.15 | Q |
| 2 | Arnedas Kelmelis | Lithuania | 7:45.12 | Q |
| 3 | Arie Rasmussen Magasiva | New Zealand | 7:48.40 | Q |
| 4 | Jakub Herhonek | Slovakia | 7:49.52 | FC |
| 5 | Savin Rodenburg | Belgium | 8:00.76 | FD |
| 6 | Lee Jui-che | Chinese Taipei | 8:10.68 | FD |

==== Quarterfinal 4 ====
| Rank | Rower | Country | Time | Notes |
|---|---|---|---|---|
| 1 | Joshua Knight | Great Britain | 7:50.59 | Q |
| 2 | Bojan Reuffurth | Switzerland | 7:59.52 | Q |
| 3 | Nicolai Haraldseth | Norway | 8:02.94 | Q |
| 4 | Bapan Askhanbek | Kazakhstan | 8:06.23 | FD |
| 5 | Narongsak Naksaeng | Thailand | 8:06.85 | FD |
| 6 | Nicholas Szigeter | Australia | 8:57.47 | FD |

=== Semifinals ===
The three fastest boats in each heat advanced directly to the final A. The remaining boats were sent to the final B.

==== Semifinal 1 ====
| Rank | Rower | Country | Time | Notes |
|---|---|---|---|---|
| 1 | Ivan Corșunov | Moldova | 7:01.96 | Q |
| 2 | Joshua Knight | Great Britain | 7:02.74 | Q |
| 3 | Bojan Reuffurth | Switzerland | 7:05.63 | Q |
| 4 | Cezary Litka | Poland | 7:07.34 | FB |
| 5 | Giovanni Borgonovo | Italy | 7:22.18 | FB |
| 6 | Nicolai Haraldseth | Norway | 7:27.26 | FB |

==== Semifinal 2 ====
| Rank | Rower | Country | Time | Notes |
|---|---|---|---|---|
| 1 | Jonas Gelsen | Germany | 7:02.99 | Q |
| 2 | Percijn van Haeringen | Netherlands | 7:04.11 | Q |
| 3 | Arnedas Kelmelis | Lithuania | 7:04.34 | Q |
| 4 | Konrad Hultsch | Austria | 7:04.92 | FB |
| 5 | Maksim Zhevlachenko | Individual Neutral Athletes | 7:10.29 | FB |
| 6 | Arie Rasmussen Magasiva | New Zealand | 7:24.46 | FB |

=== Finals ===
The A final determined the rankings for places 1 to 6. Additional rankings were determined in the other finals.

==== Final E ====
| Rank | Rower | Country | Time | Total rank |
|---|---|---|---|---|
| 1 | Seo Sung-woo | South Korea | 7:31.46 | 25 |
| 2 | Yan Kamanov | Ukraine | 7:33.13 | 26 |
| 3 | Pratik Gupta | India | 7:40.91 | 27 |
| 4 | Alexander Jurado | Spain | 7:41.71 | 28 |
| 5 | Nathan Damas | United States | 8:02.72 | 29 |

==== Final D ====
| Rank | Rower | Country | Time | Total rank |
|---|---|---|---|---|
| 1 | Savin Rodenburg | Belgium | 7:19.29 | 19 |
| 2 | Narongsak Naksaeng | Thailand | 7:19.66 | 20 |
| 3 | Nicholas Szigeter | Australia | 7:23.50 | 21 |
| 4 | Bapan Askhanbek | Kazakhstan | 7:33.34 | 22 |
| 5 | Nurlan Pashayev | Azerbaijan | 7:37.77 | 23 |
| 6 | Lee Jui-che | Chinese Taipei | 7:42.03 | 24 |

==== Final C ====
| Rank | Rower | Country | Time | Total rank |
|---|---|---|---|---|
| 1 | Charles-Étienne Tabet | Canada | 7:10.67 | 13 |
| 2 | Marek Diblík | Czech Republic | 7:11.50 | 14 |
| 3 | Mehrojbek Mamatkulov | Uzbekistan | 7:11.75 | 15 |
| 4 | Rikuto Sugawara | Japan | 7:22.21 | 16 |
| 5 | Jakub Herhonek | Slovakia | 7:23.71 | 17 |
| 6 | Balázs Szöllősi | Hungary | 7:27.36 | 18 |

==== Final B ====
| Rank | Rower | Country | Time | Total rank |
|---|---|---|---|---|
| 1 | Maksim Zhevlachenko | Individual Neutral Athletes | 7:05.06 | 7 |
| 2 | Konrad Hultsch | Austria | 7:07.53 | 8 |
| 3 | Cezary Litka | Poland | 7:12.10 | 9 |
| 4 | Arie Rasmussen Magasiva | New Zealand | 7:14.17 | 10 |
| 5 | Giovanni Borgonovo | Italy | 7:18.31 | 11 |
| 6 | Nicolai Haraldseth | Norway | 7:27.11 | 12 |

==== Final A ====
| Rank | Rower | Country | Time | Notes |
|---|---|---|---|---|
| 1st place, gold medalist(s) | Ivan Corșunov | Moldova | 7:23.87 | |
| 2nd place, silver medalist(s) | Joshua Knight | Great Britain | 7:25.15 | |
| 3rd place, bronze medalist(s) | Arnedas Kelmelis | Lithuania | 7:27.42 | |
| 4 | Bojan Reuffurth | Switzerland | 7:31.53 | |
| 5 | Jonas Gelsen | Germany | 7:41.54 | |
| 6 | Percijn van Haeringen | Netherlands | 7:49.01 | |
