= Swimming at the 2025 Summer World University Games – Men's 50 metre butterfly =

Men's 50 metre butterfly at the 2025 Summer World University Games
- Venue: Schwimm- und Sprunghalle im Europasportpark
- Location: Berlin
- Dates: 17 July (heats and semifinals); 18 July (final)
- Competitors: 74 from 47 nations

Medalists
gold medal	Simone Stefanì	Italy
silver medal	Eldorbek Usmonov	Uzbekistan
bronze medal	Lorenzo Gargani	Italy

The men's 50 metre butterfly at the 2025 Summer World University Games in Rhine-Ruhr, Germany was held from 17 to 18 July 2025. Simone Stefanì from Italy won the gold medal, Eldorbek Usmonov from Uzbekistan took the silver medal and Lorenzo Gargani from Italy earned the bronze medal.

== Schedule ==
All times are Central European Time (UTC+1)

Date	Time	Round
17 July	09:48	Heats
17 July	19:18	Semifinals
18 July	19:30	Final

== Records ==
Prior to the competition, the world and Universiade records were as follows.

Category	Swimmer	Record	Date	Place	Event
World record	(Ukraine) Andriy Govorov	22.27	1 July 2018	Rome, Italy	55th International Trophy Sette Colli
Universiade record	(Ukraine) Andriy Govorov	22.90	21 August 2017	Taipei, Chinese Taipei	2017 Summer Universiade

== Results ==
=== Heats ===
All entered athletes competed across multiple seeded heats in the morning session. Swimmers with the top 16 fastest times advanced, regardless of which individual heat they swam.

Rank	Heat	Lane	Swimmer	Nation	Time	Notes
1	9	6	Ole Eidam	Germany	23.33	Q
2	9	4	Eldorbek Usmonov	Uzbekistan	23.40	Q
3	9	2	Björn Kammann	Germany	23.53	Q
4	8	6	Chris Weeks	Canada	23.67	Q
5	10	4	Lorenzo Gargani	Italy	23.69	Q
6	10	8	Aleksandr Shchegolev	Individual Neutral Athletes	23.70	Q
7	9	3	Simone Stefanì	Italy	23.72	Q
8	8	3	Paweł Uryniuk	Poland	23.79	Q
9	9	5	Baek In-chul	South Korea	23.80	Q
10	10	3	Matthew Klinge	United States	23.94	Q
11	8	7	Shoon Mitsunaga	Japan	23.96	Q
12	6	8	Benedicton Manickaraj	India	24.00	Q
13	7	5	Maddox Roberts	Great Britain	24.05	Q
14	8	4	Kamal Muhammad	United States	24.09	Q
15	10	2	Riku Kitagawa	Japan	24.10	Q
15	8	5	Ihor Troianovskyi	Ukraine	24.10	Q
17	10	5	Theo Alloza	Brazil	24.11	
18	8	1	Lucas Peixoto	Brazil	24.13	
19	10	1	Adrian Jaśkiewicz	Poland	24.14	
19	8	8	Thomas Nankervis	Australia	24.14	
21	9	8	Rishat Zhumagulov	Kazakhstan	24.19	
22	9	7	Robin Yeboah	Switzerland	24.20	
23	10	7	Radim Švarc	Czech Republic	24.25	
24	7	3	Emre Gürdenli	Turkey	24.29	
25	10	6	Brodie Gordon-Gibson	Great Britain	24.36	
26	7	2	Noah Retzler	Switzerland	24.37	
27	6	4	Vadym Naumenko	Ukraine	24.40	
28	7	6	Ng Cheuk Yin	Hong Kong	24.45	
29	6	6	Guy Brooks	South Africa	24.46	
30	7	1	Sebastian Luňák	Czech Republic	24.50	
31	7	7	Andreas Rizek	Austria	24.51	
31	9	1	Bryan Leong	Malaysia	24.51	
33	7	4	Mikhail Kleshko	Uzbekistan	24.57	
34	1	3	Abdurrahman Rustamov	Azerbaijan	24.61	
35	6	5	Ho Siu Lun	Hong Kong	24.65	
36	8	2	Eitan Ben Shitrit	Israel	24.71	
37	5	5	Ronn Brännkärr	Finland	24.81	
38	6	7	Anton Kocsu	Hungary	24.83	
39	1	4	Artur Tobler	Estonia	24.84	
40	7	8	Gleb Kovalenya	Kazakhstan	24.87	
41	4	6	Owethu Mahan	South Africa	24.93	
42	3	4	Matheo Mateos	Paraguay	25.04	
43	5	3	Radoslav Polčič	Slovakia	25.09	
44	5	6	Liam Weaver	Canada	25.17	
45	4	5	Rhys Ng	Singapore	25.21	
46	2	2	Nicolas Retrive	Argentina	25.23	
47	6	2	Staņislavs Šakels	Latvia	25.24	
48	4	3	Elías Ardiles	Chile	25.28	
49	5	2	Markos Iakovidis	Cyprus	25.33	
50	6	3	Siim Kesküla	Estonia	25.35	
51	5	4	Ramil Valizada	Azerbaijan	25.37	
52	4	2	Harsh Saroha	India	25.41	
53	4	4	Ephraim Tan	Singapore	25.45	
54	5	7	Steven Jaramillo	Ecuador	25.52	
55	6	1	Giorgi Koiava	Georgia	25.55	
56	4	1	Sandev Senaratna	Sri Lanka	25.88	
57	4	7	Mamuka Shengelia	Georgia	25.91	
58	3	5	Andrés Arias	Colombia	25.96	
59	4	8	Bjourn Mhlanga	Zimbabwe	26.15	
60	5	1	Jegors Mihailovs	Latvia	26.38	
61	3	7	Lei Hoi Man}	Macau	26.39	
62	5	8	Belgudei Uyanga	Mongolia	26.58	
63	2	7	Nicolas Bobadilla	Chile	26.74	
64	3	6	Montross Phansovannarun	Cambodia	26.93	
65	3	2	John Kimuli	Uganda	27.85	
66	2	3	Nasser Al-Kindi	Oman	27.86	
67	3	3	Victor Jiménez	Ecuador	27.96	
68	2	4	Namanya Ampaire	Uganda	28.14	
69	3	1	Induwara Liyanage	Sri Lanka	28.20	
70	3	8	Sameer Asif	Pakistan	28.54	
71	2	5	Jesse Okumu	Kenya	28.65	
72	2	1	Marc Fares	Lebanon	30.05	
73	2	6	Eyad Al-Siyabi	Oman	30.16	
74	1	5	Anar Batsaikhan	Mongolia	31.32	

=== Semifinals ===
The 16 advancing swimmers were split into two semifinal heats of 8 during the evening session. The swimmers recording the top 8 fastest times advanced to the final round.

Rank	Heat	Lane	Swimmer	Nation	Time	Notes
1	2	6	Simone Stefanì	Italy	23.23	Q
2	2	4	Ole Eidam	Germany	23.24	Q
3	1	4	Eldorbek Usmonov	Uzbekistan	23.31	Q
4	2	3	Lorenzo Gargani	Italy	23.36	Q
5	1	6	Paweł Uryniuk	Poland	23.63	Q
6	1	2	Matthew Klinge	United States	23.67	Q
6	2	5	Björn Kammann	Germany	23.67	Q
8	2	8	Ihor Troianovskyi	Ukraine	23.71	Q
9	1	3	Aleksandr Shchegolev	Individual Neutral Athletes	23.72	
10	2	7	Shoon Mitsunaga	Japan	23.73	
11	1	5	Chris Weeks	Canada	23.87	
11	2	2	Baek In-chul	South Korea	23.87	
13	1	7	Benedicton Manickaraj	India	23.96	
13	1	8	Riku Kitagawa	Japan	23.96	
15	2	1	Maddox Roberts	Great Britain	24.05	
16	1	1	Kamal Muhammad	United States	24.07	

=== Final ===
The fastest 8 swimmers competed in a single race to determine the gold, silver and bronze medalists.

Rank	Lane	Swimmer	Nation	Time	Notes
1st place, gold medalist(s)	4	Simone Stefanì	Italy	23.28	
2nd place, silver medalist(s)	3	Eldorbek Usmonov	Uzbekistan	23.33	
3rd place, bronze medalist(s)	6	Lorenzo Gargani	Italy	23.42	
4	5	Ole Eidam	Germany	23.55	
5	2	Paweł Uryniuk	Poland	23.65	
6	1	Matthew Klinge	United States	23.67	
7	7	Björn Kammann	Germany	23.68	
8	8	Ihor Troianovskyi	Ukraine	23.87	
