= Judo at the 2025 Summer World University Games – Men's 60 kg =

Men's 60 kg at the 2025 Summer World University Games
- Venue: Messe Essen
- Location: Essen
- Dates: 23 July
- Competitors: 24

Medalists
| gold medal | Yamato Fukuda | Japan |
| silver medal | Luis Barroso López | Spain |
| bronze medal | Tumenjargal Tuvshintur | Mongolia |
| bronze medal | Aman Bakytzhan | Kazakhstan |

The men's 60 kg at the 2025 Summer World University Games in Rhine-Ruhr, Germany was held 23 July 2025. Yamato Fukuda of Japan captured the gold medal. Luis Barroso López of Spain took home the silver medal. The bronze medals were awarded to Tumenjargal Tuvshintur of Mongolia and Aman Bakytzhan of Kazakhstan.

== Schedule ==
All times are Central European Time (UTC+1)

| Date | Time | Event |
|---|---|---|
| 23 July 2015 | 09:00 | Preliminary Rounds |
| 23 July 2015 | 17:00 | Final Block |

== Results ==
Athletes advanced through direct knockout rounds—including the round of 32, round of 16, quarterfinals, and semifinals—to determine the two finalists fighting for the gold and silver medals. Parallel to the main bracket, a repechage system allowed defeated quarterfinalists to work their way back into the tournament, culminating in two separate bronze medal matches where the repechage winners faced the losing semifinalists.

Round of 32
I Błaszczak (POL) | 000 (yellow card)
B Mirzayev (AZE) | 010
M Sourov (BAN) | 000
Hwang Hs (KOR) | 100
T Witteveen (NED) | 000
B Fernandes (POR) | 101
S Kim (UKR) | 001
H Cargnelli (FRA) | 000
J Yang (USA) | 010
Chiu Wj (TPE) | 000
N Kutscher (GER) | 100
C Chheav (CAM) | 000
B Rivera (ECU) | 000 (yellow card)
E Bellan (LBN) | 001 (yellow card)
Lucky (IND) | 010
L Rios (BRA) | 000

Round of 16
Y Fukuda (JPN) | 100
B Mirzayev (AZE) | 000
A Tîrsînă (MDA) | 100 (yellow card)
Hwang Hs (KOR) | 000 (yellow card)
L Modebadze (GEO) | 010
B Fernandes (POR) | 000 (yellow card)
D Naji (HUN) | 102
S Kim (UKR) | 000
L Barroso (ESP) | 010 (yellow card)
J Yang (USA) | 001
A Bakytzhan (KAZ) | 100
N Kutscher (GER) | 000
A Ibrohimov (UZB) | 100
E Bellan (LBN) | 000
T Tuvshintur (MGL) | 100
Lucky (IND) | 000

Quarter-finals
Y Fukuda (JPN) | 100
A Tîrsînă (MDA) | 000
L Modebadze (GEO) | 100
D Naji (HUN) | 000
L Barroso (ESP) | 001
A Bakytzhan (KAZ) | 000
A Ibrohimov (UZB) | 001
T Tuvshintur (MGL) | 011

Semi-finals
Y Fukuda (JPN) | 100 (yellow card)
L Modebadze (GEO) | 000
L Barroso (ESP) | 010
T Tuvshintur (MGL) | 000

Final
Y Fukuda (JPN) | 100
L Barroso (ESP) | 000

Repechage Phases

Repechage
A Tîrsînă (MDA) | 000
D Naji (HUN) | 020 (yellow card)
A Bakytzhan (KAZ) | 100 (yellow card)
A Ibrohimov (UZB) | 000

Bronze medal
D Naji (HUN) | 000
T Tuvshintur (MGL) | 100
A Bakytzhan (KAZ) | 100
L Modebadze (GEO) | 000
