= Judo at the 2025 Summer World University Games – Women's 52 kg =

Women's 52 kg at the 2025 Summer World University Games
- Venue: Messe Essen
- Location: Essen
- Dates: 23 July
- Competitors: 30

Medalists
gold medal	Jang Se-yun	South Korea
silver medal	Hako Fukunaga	Japan
bronze medal	Tereza Bodnárová	Czech Republic
bronze medal	Léa Beres	France

The women's 52 kg at the 2025 Summer World University Games in Rhine-Ruhr, Germany was held 23 July 2025. Jang Se-yun of South Korea captured the gold medal. Hako Fukunaga of Japan took home the silver medal. The bronze medals were awarded to Tereza Bodnárová of Czech Republic and Léa Beres of France.

== Schedule ==
All times are Central European Time (UTC+1)

Date	Time	Event
23 July 2015	09:00	Preliminary Rounds
23 July 2015	17:00	Final Block

== Results ==
Athletes advanced through direct knockout rounds—including the round of 32, round of 16, quarterfinals, and semifinals—to determine the two finalists fighting for the gold and silver medals. Parallel to the main bracket, a repechage system allowed defeated quarterfinalists to work their way back into the tournament, culminating in two separate bronze medal matches where the repechage winners faced the losing semifinalists.

Round of 32
S Vainstein (MDA)	001
V Narváez (ARG)	000 (yellow card)
T Bodnárová (CZE)	001
K Zhylkybay (KAZ)	000 (yellow card)
C Tan (SGP)	101
S Waeen (PAK)	000
S Chopade (IND)	010 (yellow card)
F van der Salm (NED)	100 (yellow card)
R Hoang (USA)	000
K Klimczak (POL)	100
S Rafkatova (UZB)	010
B Karabulut (TUR)	011 (yellow card)
M Jarama (ECU)	000 (yellow card)
L Gómez (ESP)	100
D Chavarria (MEX)	000 (yellow card)
S Kun (CAM)	002 (yellow card)
L Beres (FRA)	020
Wong WI (MAC)	000
U Bernard (SLO)	000
F Bădiceanu (ROU)	001
H Fukunaga (JPN)	110
M Miroshnichenko (UKR)	000
G Conceição (BRA)	100 (yellow card)
C Serra (GER)	000
R Keller (HUN)	000
S Delgersaikhan (MGL)	100

Round of 16
Jang Sy (KOR)	100
V Narváez (ARG)	000
T Bodnárová (CZE)	110
C Tan (SGP)	000
F van der Salm (NED)	100
K Klimczak (POL)	000
B Karabulut (TUR)	001 (yellow card)
L Gómez (ESP)	000
A Valiyeva (AZE)	020
S Kun (CAM)	000
L Beres (FRA)	100
F Bădiceanu (ROU)	000
T Keen (GBR)	001
H Fukunaga (JPN)	010
G Conceição (BRA)	001
S Delgersaikhan (MGL)	000

Quarter-finals
Jang Sy (KOR)	110 (yellow card)
T Bodnárová (CZE)	000
F van der Salm (NED)	000 (yellow card)
B Karabulut (TUR)	100
A Valiyeva (AZE)	100
L Beres (FRA)	000
H Fukunaga (JPN)	001
G Conceição (BRA)	000

Semi-finals
Jang Sy (KOR)	101
B Karabulut (TUR)	000
A Valiyeva (AZE)	000 (yellow card)
H Fukunaga (JPN)	101

Final
Jang Sy (KOR)	100
H Fukunaga (JPN)	000

Repechage Phases

Repechage
T Bodnárová (CZE)	100
F van der Salm (NED)	000
L Beres (FRA)	010 (yellow card)
G Conceição (BRA)	000

Bronze medal
T Bodnárová (CZE)	100
A Valiyeva (AZE)	000
L Beres (FRA)	110 (yellow card)
B Karabulut (TUR)	000
