= Swimming at the 2025 Summer World University Games – Men's 50 metre freestyle =

Men's 50 metre freestyle at the 2025 Summer World University Games
- Venue: Schwimm- und Sprunghalle im Europasportpark
- Location: Berlin
- Dates: 22 July (heats and semifinals); 23 July (final)
- Competitors: 74 from 47 nations

Medalists
gold medal	Matthew King	United States
silver medal	Giovanni Guatti	Italy
bronze medal	Jokūbas Keblys	Lithuania

The men's 50 metre freestyle at the 2025 Summer World University Games in Rhine-Ruhr, Germany was held from 22 to 23 July 2025. Matthew King from the United States won the gold medal, Giovanni Guatti from Italy took the silver medal and Jokūbas Keblys from Lithuania earned the bronze medal.

== Schedule ==
All times are Central European Time (UTC+1)

Date	Time	Round
22 July	09:35	Heats
22 July	20:25	Semifinals
23 July	19:15	Final

== Records ==
Prior to the competition, the world and Universiade records were as follows.

Category	Swimmer	Record	Date	Place	Event
World record	(Brazil) César Cielo	20.91	18 December 2009	São Paulo, Brazil	2009 Brazilian Championships
Universiade record	(Russia) Vladimir Morozov	21.67	15 July 2013	Kazan, Russia	2013 Summer Universiade

== Results ==
=== Heats ===
All entered athletes competed across multiple seeded heats in the morning session. Swimmers with the top 16 fastest times advanced, regardless of which individual heat they swam.

Rank	Heat	Lane	Swimmer	Nation	Time	Notes
1	10	4	Matthew King	United States	22.16	Q
2	9	5	Jokūbas Keblys	Lithuania	22.22	Q
3	8	5	Andrea Candela	Italy	22.26	Q
4	8	3	Illia Linnyk	Ukraine	22.30	Q
5	8	4	Daniel Baltes	United States	22.31	Q
6	10	6	Giovanni Guatti	Italy	22.33	Q
7	10	5	Elias Persson	Sweden	22.36	Q
8	9	7	Ole Eidam	Germany	22.38	Q
9	10	1	Robin Yeboah	Switzerland	22.42	Q
10	8	6	Patrick Dinu	Romania	22.49	Q
11	9	4	Lucas Peixoto	Brazil	22.64	Q
12	9	1	Takaki Hara	Japan	22.65	Q
12	10	3	Yuya Ichimura	Japan	22.65	Q
14	9	6	Moritz Schaller	Germany	22.68	Q
14	8	7	Aleksandr Shchegolev	Individual Neutral Athletes	22.68	Q
16	8	1	Leon Opatril	Austria	22.72	Q
17	7	1	Emre Gürdenli	Turkey	22.78	
18	10	2	Konrad Zieliński	Poland	22.80	
19	9	2	Maddox Roberts	Great Britain	22.81	
20	9	3	Dmitrii Zhavoronkov	Individual Neutral Athletes	22.82	
21	6	1	Nikolas Antoniou	Cyprus	22.83	
22	9	8	Chris Weeks	Canada	22.89	
23	10	8	Gleb Kovalenya	Kazakhstan	22.93	
24	8	2	Baek In-chul	South Korea	22.94	
25	7	8	Guy Brooks	South Africa	22.96	
26	2	5	Vidar Carlbaum	Sweden	22.99	
27	8	8	Radim Švarc	Czech Republic	23.00	
28	5	2	Srihari Nataraj	India	23.06	
29	10	7	Liam Weaver	Canada	23.09	
30	6	7	Siim Kesküla	Estonia	23.11	
31	6	4	Mikhail Kleshko	Uzbekistan	23.12	
31	7	2	Noah Retzler	Switzerland	23.12	
33	5	1	Fan Chen-wei	Chinese Taipei	23.15	
34	4	2	Ng Chi Hin	Macau	23.17	
35	7	6	Bryan Leong	Malaysia	23.19	
36	6	8	Ronny Brännkärr	Finland	23.20	
37	6	2	Chuang Mu-lun	Chinese Taipei	23.25	
38	5	8	Durai Thomas	India	23.28	
39	6	3	Nathan Chan	Hong Kong	23.33	
40	7	7	Nikolas Kosta	Cyprus	23.36	
41	1	4	Nicolas Retrive	Argentina	23.43	
42	6	5	Lim Yin Chuen	Malaysia	23.53	
43	5	3	Georg Filippov	Estonia	23.55	
44	6	6	Paweł Smoliński	Poland	23.56	
45	4	8	Elías Ardiles	Chile	23.61	
46	7	4	Angelo Giani	Great Britain	23.64	
47	5	5	Staņislavs Šakels	Latvia	23.69	
48	3	3	Radoslav Polčič	Slovakia	23.81	
48	4	3	Samuel Tang	Singapore	23.81	
50	2	1	Abdurrahman Rustamov	Azerbaijan	23.94	
51	4	4	Jegors Mihailovs	Latvia	23.95	
52	7	7	Agustin Rasche	Argentina	23.98	
53	4	5	Kai Lim	Singapore	24.01	
54	4	6	Mamuka Shengelia	Georgia	24.19	
55	5	6	Andrés Arias	Colombia	24.23	
56	4	1	Ondrej Duša	Slovakia	24.24	
57	3	2	Luka Tsuriashvili	Georgia	24.38	
58	4	7	Steven Jaramillo	Ecuador	24.45	
59	1	5	Chong Ioi Lam	Macau	24.61	
60	3	1	Martín Álvarez	Ecuador	24.90	
61	3	5	Andrés Estrada	Colombia	25.16	
62	3	6	Bjourn Mhlanga	Zimbabwe	25.21	
63	3	4	Tamir Rentsendorj	Mongolia	25.27	
64	3	7	Phansovannarun Montross	Cambodia	25.66	
65	3	8	Induwara Liyanage	Sri Lanka	26.12	
66	2	8	Marc Fares	Lebanon	26.33	
67	1	3	Nihad Yusibov	Azerbaijan	26.48	
68	2	6	Namanya Ampaire	Uganda	26.52	
69	2	3	Moosa Aulad	Oman	27.02	
70	2	4	Jesse Okumu	Kenya	27.16	
71	5	2	Mohamed Al-Jabri	Oman	27.65	
—	2	4	Marcus Da Silva	Australia	DNS	
—	5	7	Enkhtamir Batbayar	Mongolia	DNS	
—	7	3	Eldorbek Usmonov	Uzbekistan	DNS	

=== Semifinals ===
The 16 advancing swimmers were split into two semifinal heats of 8 during the evening session. The swimmers recording the top 8 fastest times advanced to the final round.

Rank	Heat	Lane	Swimmer	Nation	Time	Notes
1	2	4	Matthew King	United States	21.93	Q
2	1	4	Jokūbas Keblys	Lithuania	22.07	Q
3	1	5	Illia Linnyk	Ukraine	22.08	Q
4	2	3	Daniel Baltes	United States	22.13	Q
5	2	6	Elias Persson	Sweden	22.15	Q
6	1	3	Giovanni Guatti	Italy	22.17	Q
7	2	5	Andrea Candela	Italy	22.18	Q
8	2	7	Lucas Peixoto	Brazil	22.27	Q
9	1	1	Aleksandr Shchegolev	Individual Neutral Athletes	22.29	
10	1	6	Ole Eidam	Germany	22.42	
11	1	2	Patrick Dinu	Romania	22.49	
12	2	8	Moritz Schaller	Germany	22.57	
13	1	7	Yuya Ichimura	Japan	22.58	
14	2	1	Takaki Hara	Japan	22.63	
15	2	2	Robin Yeboah	Switzerland	22.64	
16	1	8	Leon Opatril	Austria	22.65	

=== Final ===
The fastest 8 swimmers competed in a single race to determine the gold, silver and bronze medalists.

Rank	Lane	Swimmer	Nation	Time	Notes
1st place, gold medalist(s)	4	Matthew King	United States	21.84	
2nd place, silver medalist(s)	7	Giovanni Guatti	Italy	22.01	
3rd place, bronze medalist(s)	5	Jokūbas Keblys	Lithuania	22.02	
4	3	Illia Linnyk	Ukraine	22.10	
5	1	Andrea Candela	Italy	22.17	
5	6	Daniel Baltes	United States	22.17	
7	8	Lucas Peixoto	Brazil	22.24	
8	2	Elias Persson	Sweden	22.25	
