= Fencing at the 2025 Summer World University Games – Women's individual foil =

Women's individual foil at the 2025 Summer World University Games
- Venue: Messe Essen
- Location: Essen
- Dates: 18 July
- Competitors: 55 from 22 nations

Medalists
gold medal	Aurora Grandis	Italy
silver medal	Mo Byeol-i	South Korea
bronze medal	Esther Bonny	France
bronze medal	Carlotta Ferrari	Italy

The women's individual foil at the 2025 Summer World University Games in Rhine-Ruhr, Germany was held 18 July 2025. The gold medal was won by Italy's Aurora Grandis, the silver went to South Korea's Mo Byeol-i, and the bronze medals were awarded to France's Esther Bonny and Italy's Carlotta Ferrari.

== Pool Results ==
55 fencers are divided into pools of 6 or 7. Everyone fights everyone within their pool. Matches last for 3 minutes or until one fencer scores 5 touches. Results determine seedings for the next round. The lowest-ranked fencers (typically 20–30%) are eliminated immediately.

Qualified for Table of 32
Qualified for Table of 64

=== Pool 1 ===
#	Seed	Athlete	1	2	3	4	5	6	7	V#	M#	Ind.	TG	TR	Diff.	RP
1	16	Kim Ho-yeon (KOR)		V_{5}	V_{5}	D_{0}	D_{4}	V_{5}	D_{0}	3	6	0.50	19	18	1	3
2	33	Celia Hohenadel (GER)	D_{0}		D_{1}	D_{4}	V_{5}	V_{5}	V_{5}	3	6	0.50	20	23	-3	6
3	17	Ku Hio Lam (MAC)	D_{3}	V_{5}		D_{1}	D_{3}	V_{5}	V_{5}	3	6	0.50	22	24	-2	5
4	1	Irene Bertini (ITA)	V_{5}	V_{5}	V_{5}		V_{5}	V_{5}	V_{5}	6	6	1.00	30	10	20	1
5	46	Aleksandra Wieczorek (POL)	V_{5}	D_{4}	V_{5}	D_{1}		V_{5}	D_{4}	3	6	0.50	24	25	-1	4
6	48	Jara del Cura (ESP)	D_{0}	D_{0}	D_{4}	D_{0}	D_{3}		D_{1}	0	6	0.00	8	30	-22	7
7	32	Janelle Leung (HKG)	V_{5}	D_{4}	D_{4}	D_{4}	V_{5}	V_{5}		3	6	0.50	27	20	7	2

=== Pool 2 ===
#	Seed	Athlete	1	2	3	4	5	6	7	V#	M#	Ind.	TG	TR	Diff.	RP
1	18	Lam Chi Mei (MAC)		D_{3}	D_{3}	D_{1}	D_{3}	V_{5}	V_{5}	2	6	0.33	20	27	-7	5
2	52	Lilla Hanzl (HUN)	V_{5}		D_{0}	D_{1}	D_{0}	D_{4}	D_{3}	1	6	0.17	13	27	-14	7
3	2	Daphne Chan (HKG)	V_{5}	V_{5}		V_{5}	V_{5}	D_{3}	V_{4}	5	6	0.83	27	15	12	1
4	15	Emma Mika (FRA)	V_{5}	V_{4}	D_{2}		V_{5}	V_{5}	D_{1}	4	6	0.67	22	17	5	3
5	50	Sofía Gaydos (ESP)	V_{5}	V_{5}	D_{2}	D_{2}		V_{5}	D_{3}	3	6	0.50	22	20	2	4
6	34	Štěpánka Němcová (CZE)	D_{3}	V_{5}	V_{5}	D_{3}	D_{2}		D_{2}	2	6	0.33	20	27	-7	5
7	31	Dominika Wasilczuk (POL)	D_{4}	V_{5}	D_{3}	V_{5}	V_{5}	V_{5}		4	6	0.67	27	18	9	2

=== Pool 3 ===
#	Seed	Athlete	1	2	3	4	5	6	7	V#	M#	Ind.	TG	TR	Diff.	RP
1	53	Daria Malysheva (ARM)		D_{2}	V_{5}	V_{5}	D_{3}	V_{5}	V_{5}	4	6	0.67	25	19	6	2
2	3	Carlotta Ferrari (ITA)	V_{5}		V_{5}	V_{5}	V_{5}	V_{5}	V_{5}	6	6	1.00	30	14	16	1
3	49	Mariana García (ESP)	D_{1}	D_{2}		D_{1}	D_{2}	D_{1}	D_{1}	0	6	0.00	8	30	-22	7
4	14	Ayano Iimura (JPN)	D_{2}	D_{2}	V_{5}		V_{5}	D_{4}	V_{5}	3	6	0.50	23	21	2	3
5	19	Michala Illeková (CZE)	V_{5}	D_{3}	V_{5}	D_{1}		V_{5}	D_{4}	3	6	0.50	23	23	0	4
6	35	Amandine Charlier (BEL)	D_{3}	D_{2}	V_{5}	V_{5}	D_{3}		V_{5}	3	6	0.50	23	24	-1	5
7	30	Antonina Lachman (POL)	D_{3}	D_{3}	V_{5}	D_{4}	V_{5}	D_{4}		2	6	0.33	24	25	-1	6

=== Pool 4 ===
#	Seed	Athlete	1	2	3	4	5	6	7	V#	M#	Ind.	TG	TR	Diff.	RP
1	39	Katherine Kim (USA)		V_{5}	D_{2}	V_{5}	V_{5}	D_{3}	V_{5}	4	6	0.67	25	19	6	2
2	45	Nikola Junele (LAT)	D_{2}		D_{0}	D_{4}	D_{1}	D_{2}	D_{2}	0	6	0.00	11	30	-19	7
3	4	Aurora Grandis (ITA)	V_{5}	V_{5}		V_{5}	V_{5}	V_{5}	V_{5}	6	6	1.00	30	5	25	1
4	29	Kanagalakshmi Paranjothi (IND)	D_{1}	V_{5}	D_{1}		D_{4}	D_{3}	D_{3}	1	6	0.17	17	29	-12	6
5	47	Amelia Olszewska (POL)	D_{2}	V_{5}	D_{1}	V_{5}		V_{5}	V_{5}	4	6	0.67	23	18	5	3
6	12	Rino Nagase (JPN)	V_{5}	V_{5}	D_{0}	V_{5}	D_{0}		V_{5}	4	6	0.67	20	21	-1	4
7	20	Gaia Cantucci (SVK)	D_{4}	V_{5}	D_{1}	V_{5}	D_{3}	D_{3}		2	6	0.33	21	25	-4	5

=== Pool 5 ===
#	Seed	Athlete	1	2	3	4	5	6	7	V#	M#	Ind.	TG	TR	Diff.	RP
1	54	Ella Tang (AUS)		D_{2}	D_{2}	V_{5}	D_{2}	D_{3}	V_{4}	2	6	0.33	18	25	-7	5
2	5	Yuzuha Takeyama (JPN)	V_{5}		V_{5}	V_{5}	V_{5}	D_{4}	V_{5}	5	6	0.83	29	12	17	2
3	21	Esther Bonny (FRA)	V_{5}	D_{2}		V_{5}	V_{5}	V_{5}	V_{5}	5	6	0.83	27	8	19	1
4	36	Somirin Rungsung (IND)	D_{2}	D_{0}	D_{0}		D_{2}	D_{1}	D_{2}	0	6	0.00	7	30	-23	7
5	13	Ho Ting Chan (NZL)	V_{5}	D_{2}	D_{1}	V_{5}		V_{5}	V_{5}	4	6	0.67	23	22	1	4
6	28	Viktoriia Horpenchenko (UKR)	V_{5}	V_{5}	D_{0}	V_{5}	D_{4}		V_{5}	4	6	0.67	24	21	3	3
7	43	Lara Witt (GER)	D_{3}	D_{1}	D_{0}	V_{5}	D_{4}	D_{3}		1	6	0.17	16	26	-10	6

=== Pool 6 ===
#	Seed	Athlete	1	2	3	4	5	6	7	V#	M#	Ind.	TG	TR	Diff.	RP
1	11	Sim So-eun (KOR)		V_{5}	D_{4}	V_{5}	V_{5}	V_{5}	V_{5}	5	6	0.83	29	12	17	2
2	37	Khushi Sameja (IND)	D_{0}		D_{3}	D_{1}	V_{5}	D_{0}	D_{1}	1	6	0.17	10	25	-15	7
3	6	Reina Iwamoto (JPN)	V_{5}	V_{5}		V_{5}	V_{5}	V_{5}	V_{5}	6	6	1.00	30	22	8	1
4	22	Anna Kothieringer (GER)	D_{1}	V_{5}	D_{4}		V_{5}	V_{5}	D_{2}	3	6	0.50	22	16	6	3
5	27	Chantelle May (NZL)	D_{0}	D_{3}	D_{4}	D_{0}		V_{5}	D_{4}	1	6	0.17	16	29	-13	6
6	55	Kyra Wu (USA)	D_{2}	V_{2}	D_{4}	D_{0}	D_{4}		V_{5}	2	6	0.33	17	23	-6	5
7	44	Gréta Marosi (HUN)	D_{4}	V_{5}	D_{3}	V_{5}	V_{5}	D_{3}		3	6	0.50	25	22	3	4

=== Pool 7 ===
#	Seed	Athlete	1	2	3	4	5	6	7	V#	M#	Ind.	TG	TR	Diff.	RP
1	10	Lilli Brugger-Brandauer (AUT)		V_{5}	V_{5}	V_{4}	V_{5}	V_{5}	V_{5}	6	6	1.00	29	7	22	1
2	26	Mária Nekifor (HUN)	D_{0}		V_{5}	D_{1}	V_{5}	D_{3}	V_{5}	3	6	0.50	19	21	-2	4
3	51	Sreysros Hai (CAM)	D_{0}	D_{1}		D_{1}	D_{0}	D_{2}	D_{2}	0	6	0.00	6	30	-24	7
4	7	Park Ji-hee (KOR)	D_{3}	V_{5}	V_{5}		D_{2}	V_{5}	V_{5}	4	6	0.67	25	13	12	3
5	23	Giulia Amore (ITA)	D_{4}	D_{3}	V_{5}	V_{5}		V_{5}	V_{5}	4	6	0.67	27	15	12	2
6	42	Helen Wang (NZL)	D_{0}	V_{5}	V_{5}	D_{0}	D_{1}		D_{2}	2	6	0.33	13	25	-12	6
7	38	Joys Stalinraj (IND)	D_{0}	D_{2}	V_{5}	D_{2}	D_{2}	V_{5}		2	6	0.33	16	24	-8	5

=== Pool 8 ===
#	Seed	Athlete	1	2	3	4	5	6	V#	M#	Ind.	TG	TR	Diff.	RP
1	8	Mo Byeol-i (KOR)		V_{5}	V_{5}	V_{5}	V_{5}	D_{3}	4	5	0.80	23	10	13	2
2	24	Marie Höfler (GER)	D_{1}		V_{5}	V_{5}	D_{3}	D_{4}	2	5	0.40	18	17	1	3
3	40	Iec Pek Chan (MAC)	D_{1}	D_{1}		V_{5}	V_{5}	D_{3}	2	5	0.40	15	21	-6	5
4	41	Zsófia Tölgyesi (HUN)	D_{0}	D_{1}	D_{2}		D_{0}	D_{2}	0	5	0.00	5	25	-20	6
5	9	Sophia Wu (HKG)	D_{3}	V_{5}	D_{4}	V_{5}		D_{1}	2	5	0.40	18	18	0	4
6	25	Garance Roger (FRA)	V_{5}	V_{5}	V_{5}	V_{5}	V_{5}		5	5	1.00	25	13	12	1

== Results bracket ==
Remaining fencers are placed in a tournament bracket based on pool performance. Matches consist of three 3-minute periods with 1-minute breaks. The first fencer to score 15 touches wins. If time expires tied, a 1-minute overtime period with "priority" decides the winner. Both losing semifinalists automatically receive bronze medals.

Table of 64
33	C Hohenadel (GER)	14
32	M Nekifor (HUN)	15
40T	Lam CM (MAC)	7
24	G Marosi (HUN)	15
25	A Iimura (JPN)	15
40T	Š Němcová (CZE)	14
37	A Lachman (POL)	15
28	M Illeková (CZE)	8
29	A Wieczorek (POL)	15
36	Iec PC (MAC)	8
35	S Wu (HKG)	15
30	A Charlier (BEL)	9
27	Kim Hy (KOR)	15
38	G Cantucci (SVK)	9
39	K Wu (USA)	14
26	S Gaydos (ESP)	15
31	Ku HL (MAC)	3
34	M Höfler (GER)	15

Table of 32
1	A Grandis (ITA)	15
32	M Nekifor (HUN)	10
17	A Olszewska (POL)	12
15T	D Malysheva (ARM)	15
8T	Y Takeyama (JPN)	15
24	G Marosi (HUN)	7
25	A Iimura (JPN)	15
8T	Sim Se (KOR)	11
5	G Roger (FRA)
37	A Lachman (POL)	MED
21	R Nagase (JPN)	11
12	G Amore (ITA)	15
13	Park Jh (KOR)	15
20	Chan HT (NZL)	8
29	A Wieczorek (POL)	6
4	C Ferrari (ITA)	15
3	I Bertini (ITA)	15
35	S Wu (HKG)	6
19	V Horpenchenko (UKR)	11
14	D Wasilczuk (POL)	15
11	Mo Bi (KOR)	15
22	J Leung (HKG)	12
27	Kim Hy (KOR)	15
6	R Iwamoto (JPN)	14
7	E Bonny (FRA)	15
26	S Gaydos (ESP)	13
23	A Kothieringer (GER)	15
10	D Chan (HKG)	8
15T	K Kim (USA)	15
18	E Mika (FRA)	11
34	M Höfler (GER)	15
2	L Brugger-Brandauer (AUT)	9

Table of 16
1	A Grandis (ITA)	15
15T	D Malysheva (ARM)	5
8T	Y Takeyama (JPN)	12
25	A Iimura (JPN)	13
5	G Roger (FRA)	7
12	G Amore (ITA)	15
13	Park Jh (KOR)	9
4	C Ferrari (ITA)	15
3	I Bertini (ITA)	15
14	D Wasilczuk (POL)	6
11	Mo Bi (KOR)	10
27	Kim Hy (KOR)	9
7	E Bonny (FRA)	15
23	A Kothieringer (GER)	10
15T	K Kim (USA)	15
34	M Höfler (GER)	6

Quarterfinals
1	A Grandis (ITA)	15
25	A Iimura (JPN)	4
12	G Amore (ITA)	6
4	C Ferrari (ITA)	15
3	I Bertini (ITA)	14
11	Mo Bi (KOR)	15
7	E Bonny (FRA)	15
15T	K Kim (USA)	11

Semifinals
1	A Grandis (ITA)	15
4	C Ferrari (ITA)	11
11	Mo Bi (KOR)	15
7	E Bonny (FRA)	11

Final
1	A Grandis (ITA)	15
11	Mo Bi (KOR)	11
