= Diving at the 2025 Summer World University Games – Men's team classification =

Men's team classification at the 2025 Summer World University Games
- Venue: Schwimm- und Sprunghalle im Europasportpark
- Location: Berlin
- Dates: 17–23 July
- Nations: 15

Medalists
gold medal	China
silver medal	South Korea
bronze medal	United States

The men's team classification at the 2025 Summer World University Games in Rhine-Ruhr, Germany was held from 17 to 23 July 2025. The gold medal was won by China, the silver medal by South Korea and the bronze medal by United States.

== Schedule ==
All times are Central European Time (UTC+1)

Date	Time	Round
17 July 2025	14:45	Mixed Synchronised 3m Springboard
18 July 2025	16:15	Men's 3m Springboard
19 July 2025	13:50	Mixed Team (3m / 10m)
19 July 2025	15:40	Men's 10m Platform
20 July 2025	14:25	Men's Synchronised 10m Platform
22 July 2025	14:30	Men's 1m Springboard
23 July 2025	13:25	Men's Synchronised 3m Springboard
23 July 2025	15:20	Mixed Synchronised 10m Platform

== Results ==
15 nations entered the event.

Rank	Name	Total	1 m		3 m		Platform		3m Synchro	10m Synchro	3m Synchro Mixed 50%	10m Synchro Mixed 50%	Mixed Team 50%
Rank	Name	Total	#1	#2	#1	#2	#1	#2	3m Synchro	10m Synchro	3m Synchro Mixed 50%	10m Synchro Mixed 50%	Mixed Team 50%
1st place, gold medalist(s)	China	3110.30	404.90	396.45	439.35	407.40	405.50	393.10	412.62	437.31	137.70	170.97	214.55
2nd place, silver medalist(s)	South Korea	2746.57	348.95	346.40	399.35	390.50	390.70	338.65	355.56	377.64	132.21	133.41	200.05
3rd place, bronze medalist(s)	United States	2730.23	337.65	334.80	398.55	350.80	353.35	347.30	380.34	377.04	132.82	145.68	196.75
4	Japan	2353.97	285.50	268.80	338.70	277.60	328.60	318.80	321.87	361.62	119.16	116.59	132.03
5	Germany	2229.74	299.35		390.35	376.95	372.60	322.40	354.99	400.74	144.10		218.55
6	Ukraine	2150.98	286.85	270.25	385.20	352.00	379.80	375.70	341.55	376.83			
7	Italy	1331.36	245.45		364.70		340.00	336.35		352.56			
8	Brazil	776.85	298.60		257.00		271.85						150.60
9	Georgia	588.65	309.10	221.05	286.75								
10	Individual Neutral Athletes	515.91	323.30		378.35						132.62		
11	Great Britain	360.45	298.95		315.10								
12	Lithuania	310.45	256.45		302.70								
13	Switzerland	257.60	257.60										
14	South Africa	189.60	189.60										
15	Uzbekistan	69.70			299.35								
