= Fencing at the 2025 Summer World University Games – Women's team épée =

Women's team épée at the 2025 Summer World University Games
- Venue: Messe Essen
- Location: Essen
- Dates: 20 July
- Nations: 20

Medalists
gold medal	Alice Conrad; Océane Francillone; Emma Lauvray; Kelly Lusinier	France
silver medal	Elena Ferracuti; Carola Maccagno; Eleonora Orso; Vittoria Siletti	Italy
bronze medal	Kim Na-kyeong; Kim Tae-hee; Lim Tae-hee; Park Ha-been	South Korea

The women's team épée at the 2025 Summer World University Games in Rhine-Ruhr, Germany was held 20 July 2025. France took the gold by defeating Italy 37–34 in the final match, while Ukraine completed the podium by securing the bronze.

== Results bracket ==
The tournament used a direct elimination (knockout) bracket. Teams advanced by winning their match, while losing teams were eliminated from gold medal contention. Placements were fought out down to the final ranks, including a dedicated bronze medal match for the semifinal losers.

Table of 32
17	Australia	39
16	New Zealand	45
13	India	45
20	Cambodia	19
19	Saudi Arabia	36
14	Azerbaijan	45
15	United States	45
18	Slovenia	30

Table of 16
1	Hungary	45
16	New Zealand	28
9	Switzerland	45
8	Individual Neutral Athletes	36
5	Italy	35
12	Estonia	28
13	India	21
4	Germany	45
3	Ukraine	45
14	Azerbaijan	28
11	Poland	37
6	South Korea	45
7	France	43
10	Spain	37
15	United States	37
2	Japan	45

Quarterfinals
1	Hungary	38
9	Switzerland	41
5	Italy	45
4	Germany	34
3	Ukraine	38
6	South Korea	43
7	France	38
2	Japan	37

Semifinals
9	Switzerland	32
5	Italy	45
6	South Korea	43
7	France	44

Final
5	Italy	34
7	France	37
Third place
9	Switzerland	33
6	South Korea	45
