= Swimming at the 2025 Summer World University Games – Men's 400 metre individual medley =

Men's 400 metre individual medley at the 2025 Summer World University Games
- Venue: Schwimm- und Sprunghalle im Europasportpark
- Location: Berlin
- Dates: 23 July (heats and final)
- Competitors: 29 from 22 nations

Medalists
gold medal	Takumi Mori	Japan
silver medal	Riku Yamaguchi	Japan
bronze medal	Baylor Nelson	United States

The men's 400 metre individual medley at the 2025 Summer World University Games in Rhine-Ruhr, Germany was held 23 July 2025. Takumi Mori from Japan won the gold medal, Riku Yamaguchi from Japan took the silver medal and Baylor Nelson from the United States earned the bronze medal.

== Schedule ==
All times are Central European Time (UTC+1)

Date	Time	Round
23 July	09:31	Heats
23 July	20:20	Final

== Records ==
Prior to the competition, the world and Universiade records were as follows.

Category	Swimmer	Record	Date	Place	Event
World record	(France) Léon Marchand	4:02.50	23 July 2023	Fukuoka, Japan	2023 World Championships
Universiade record	(Japan) Daiya Seto	4:11.98	26 August 2017	Taipei, Chinese Taipei	2017 Summer Universiade

== Results ==
=== Heats ===
All entered athletes competed across multiple seeded heats in the morning session. Swimmers with the top 8 fastest times advanced, regardless of which individual heat they swam.

Rank	Heat	Lane	Swimmer	Nation	Time	Notes
1	4	5	Mason Laur	United States	4:17.64	Q
2	4	3	Takumi Mori	Japan	4:17.71	Q
3	4	4	Riku Yamaguchi	Japan	4:17.89	Q
4	3	5	Baylor Nelson	United States	4:20.26	Q
5	4	7	Diego Mira	Spain	4:20.87	Q
6	3	2	Heorhii Lukashev	Ukraine	4:21.28	Q
7	4	6	Michal Judickij	Czech Republic	4:21.54	Q
8	3	6	Simone Spediacci	Italy	4:22.24	Q
9	4	8	Polat Turnali	Turkey	4:23.42	
10	4	2	Alberto Hernández	Spain	4:25.06	
11	3	3	Collyn Gagne	Canada	4:25.39	
12	3	7	Jeremias Pock	Germany	4:26.19	
13	3	1	Fu Kun-ming	Chinese Taipei	4:28.15	
14	4	1	Filip Suchański	Poland	4:28.73	
15	2	5	Jaš Berložnik	Slovenia	4:28.95	
16	3	8	Maxwell Seidel	Switzerland	4:30.67	
17	2	6	Cameron Casali	South Africa	4:31.32	
18	2	3	Shoun Ganguly	India	4:33.56	
19	2	4	Tan Khai Xin	Malaysia	4:33.78	
20	3	4	Aleksei Sudarev	Individual Neutral Athletes	4:34.12	
21	2	7	Gašper Pevec	Slovenia	4:39.82	
22	2	2	Oliver Kuulpak	Estonia	4:45.56	
23	2	8	Artjom Alteberg	Estonia	4:48.18	
24	2	1	Martín Álvarez	Ecuador	4:48.30	
25	1	4	Anurag Singh	India	4:54.02	
26	1	5	Tselmeg Khash-Erdene	Mongolia	5:06.67	
27	1	3	Enzo Macedo	Argentina	5:09.36	
28	1	2	Gabriel León	Ecuador	5:46.71	
—	1	7	Said Hamidov	Azerbaijan	DSQ	

=== Final ===
The fastest 8 swimmers competed in a single race to determine the gold, silver and bronze medalists.

Rank	Lane	Swimmer	Nation	Time	Notes
1st place, gold medalist(s)	5	Takumi Mori	Japan	4:12.54	
2nd place, silver medalist(s)	3	Riku Yamaguchi	Japan	4:12.66	
3rd place, bronze medalist(s)	6	Baylor Nelson	United States	4:12.69	
4	4	Mason Laur	United States	4:14.47	
5	7	Heorhii Lukashev	Ukraine	4:18.99	
6	8	Simone Spediacci	Italy	4:19.55	
7	1	Michal Judickij	Czech Republic	4:19.76	
8	2	Diego Mira	Spain	4:20.97	
