= Matt King (swimmer) =

American swimmer

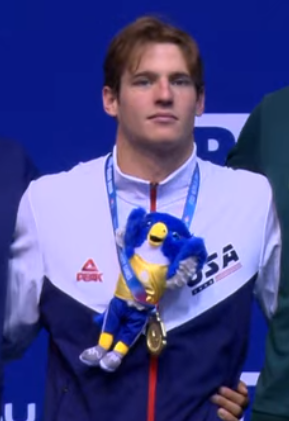
- King at the 2025 World University Games

Personal information
- Full name: Matthew Carl King
- National team: United States
- Born: February 19, 2002 (age 24) Exeter, New Hampshire, U.S.

Sport
- Country: United States
- Sport: Men's swimming
- Strokes: Freestyle
- Club: Bellevue Club Swim Team; Texas Ford Aquatics (TFA) '23
- College team: University of Virginia; University of Alabama
- Coach: Coley Stickles (U. Alabama); Todd DeSorbo (U. Virginia)
Medal record
Men's swimming
Representing the United States
Event	1st	2nd	3rd
Olympic Games	1	0	0
World Championships (LC)	2	1	3
World University Games	5	0	0
Total	8	1	3
Olympic Games
Gold medal – first place	2024 Paris	4×100 m freestyle
World Championships (LC)
Gold medal – first place	2023 Fukuoka	4×100 m medley
Gold medal – first place	2024 Doha	4×100 m medley
Silver medal – second place	2023 Fukuoka	4×100 m mixed freestyle
Bronze medal – third place	2023 Fukuoka	4×100 m freestyle
Bronze medal – third place	2024 Doha	4×100 m freestyle
Bronze medal – third place	2024 Doha	4×100 m mixed freestyle
World University Games
Gold medal – first place	2025 Rhine-Ruhr	50 m freestyle
Gold medal – first place	2025 Rhine-Ruhr	100 m freestyle
Gold medal – first place	2025 Rhine-Ruhr	4×100 m freestyle
Gold medal – first place	2025 Rhine-Ruhr	4×100 m medley
Gold medal – first place	2025 Rhine-Ruhr	4×100 m mixed freestyle

Matthew Carl King (born February 19, 2002) is an American competitive swimmer for the University of Alabama and University of Virginia. He was a 2024 Paris Olympic gold medalist for the United States in the 4x100 meter freestyle relay, though he did not swim in the event final.

== Early life and swimming ==
Matt King was born in Exeter, New Hampshire on February 19, 2002, to Linda and Craig King and had two brothers. After a family move, he attended Glacier Peak High School in Snohomish, Washington, around 30 miles North of Seattle, where he graduated in 2020. He trained during High School with the Bellevue Club Swim team where he was coached by Andrew Nguyen, and Ash Milad. At Glacier Peak High, he was coached by Ron Belleza. In February 2020, during his Senior year in High School, King was a Washington State champion in the 50 freestyle with a time of 19.81 and the 100 freestyle with a time of 43.34 while competing at the Washington Interscholastic Athletic Association state championships at the King County Aquatic Center. At the Championships that year, King accumulated enough points to be named the "Swimmer of the Meet". During his high school years, King was also a junior national champion in the 100 freestyle event.

King had planned to attend the University of Indiana but changed his mind when their Coach Coley Stickles left to coach the University of Alabama.

== University of Alabama (2020–21) ==
At Alabama, King swam for Head Coaches Coley Stickels and then Margo Geer and Assistant Coach Roman Willetts. Coach Stickles left Alabama in December 2020. King had a quick impact as a Freshman swimming for Alabama in 2021. At the 2021 SEC Championships, he surprised many by capturing the 100 freestyle title with a time of 41.66, upsetting the former champion, and swimming one of the fastest freshman times in NCAA history. He also placed second in the 50 freestyle with an 18.96, and twelfth in the 100 butterfly. In his future specialty, he helped lead the Alabama relays to four finishes in the top three, which included a win in the 4x100 freestyle relay. At his first NCAA Championships, he earned All America status with a fifth in the 100 free, a third in the 200 free relay, and a seventh in the 4x100 free relay.

== University of Virginia (2021–22) ==
King transferred to the University of Virginia for his Sophomore year where he swam for Hall of Fame Coach Todd DeSorbo, who would coach the U.S. Olympic Women's team at the 2024 Paris Olympics. At the 2022 NCAA Championships, King earned All-American honors again, placing 7th in the 100 freestyle with a time of 41.34 and leading University of Virginia to a fourth and fifth place finish respectively in the 400 and 200 freestyle relays. He placed twelfth in the 50 free with a time of 19.02. A strong program, Virginia's men's team was ranked fifteenth in the nation in 2022, and their women's team was ranked first. King continued to compete with Virginia in 2023.

== 2022 Nationals ==
In Irvine, California, at the 2022 Summer National Championships, King had an outstanding performance in the long course, with a win in the 50 freestyle with a time of 21.83 and in the 100 freestyle where he tied with a time of 48.44. As a result, King became a member of the 2022-23 USA National Team for the first time in his swimming career.

In April 2023, though he sat out some of his college eligibility in 2022, he trained with Coley Stickles at Texas Ford Aquatics who had taken time out to coach athletes for the 2021 Olympics, which had been postponed due to the COVID epidemic. Stickles was a former coach for University of Alabama where he had coached King.

King represented the United States at the 2023 World Aquatics Championship in Fukuoka, Japan. He took a bronze, gold, and silver in relay events. These included the 400 free relay where the American team took the bronze, a mixed 400 relay where the American team took a silver, and the 400 medley relay where King swam only the preliminaries, but the team took a gold in the finals. In the 2024 World Aquatics Championships in Doha, King took a gold and two bronze medals in 4x100 relay events.

== 2024 Paris Olympic gold medal ==
He qualified for the U.S. Olympic team at the 2024 US Olympic Swimming team trials in Indianapolis placing sixth in the 100m freestyle trials. Performing well, his time of 47.94 was .01 seconds off his personal best. King was only .001 seconds from qualifying for the individual 50-meter freestyle event, finishing third in the trials.

King won a gold medal in the 4x100 freestyle relay at the Paris Olympics on July 27, 2024, where the American team recorded a combined team time of 3:09.28, though he did not swim in the final heat. King swam in a preliminary heat of the 4x100, where the U.S. team placed second, where King recorded a 100-meter time of 48.40 with the U.S. team of Ryan Held, Hunter Armstrong, and Caeleb Dressel. Jack Alexy, Chris Guiliano, Hunter Armstrong, and anchor Caeleb Dressel swam the 4x100 meter freestyle gold medal finals, finishing one second ahead of the Australian team.
