= Rowing at the 2025 Summer World University Games – Women's double sculls =

Women's double sculls at the 2025 Summer World University Games
- Venue: Regattabahn Duisburg
- Location: Duisburg
- Dates: 25 July (heats); 26 July (semifinals, finals B―C); 27 July (final A)
- Competitors: 34 from 17 nations

Medalists
gold medal	Elena Sali; Sara Borghi	Italy
silver medal	Jessy Vermeer; Iris van den Berg	Netherlands
bronze medal	Wiktoria Kalinowska; Barbara Jęchorek	Poland

The women's double sculls at the 2025 Summer World University Games in Rhine-Ruhr, Germany was held from 25 to 27 July 2025. Elena Sali and Sara Borghi from Italy won the gold medals, Jessy Vermeer and Iris van den Berg from Netherlands earned the silver medals and Wiktoria Kalinowska and Barbara Jęchorek from Poland took the bronze medals.

== Schedule ==
All times are Central European Time (UTC+1)

Date	Time	Round
25 July 2025	12:38	Heats
26 July 2025	9:58	Semifinals
26 July 2025	13:56	Final C
26 July 2025	14:04	Final B
27 July 2025	11:50	Final A

== Results ==
=== Heats ===
The two fastest boats in each heat and the six fastest times advanced directly to the semifinals. The remaining boats were sent to the final C.

==== Heat 1 ====
Rank	Rowers	Country	Time	Notes
1	(b) Sara Borghi (s) Elena Sali	Italy	7:44.44	Q
2	(b) Rebekah Court (s) Rachel Bradley	Great Britain	7:47.99	Q
3	(b) Yuka Kishimoto (s) Hinako Ino	Japan	7:51.44	Q
4	(b) Viktória Harsányi (s) Janka Zsiros	Hungary	8:00.16	Q
5	(b) Marie Doležalová (s) Tereza Hrbáčková	Czech Republic	8:01.25	Q
6	(b) Lea Farac (s) Nina Farac	Croatia	8:07.97	FC

==== Heat 2 ====
Rank	Rowers	Country	Time	Notes
1	(b) Barbara Jęchorek (s) Wiktoria Kalinowska	Poland	7:49.90	Q
2	(b) Hannah Matehaere (s) Madison Neale	New Zealand	7:53.13	Q
3	(b) Morgan Zahner (s) Annelise Norkitis	United States	7:56.47	Q
4	(b) Karla Remacha (s) Lidia Florido	Spain	8:06.31	FC
5	(b) Liesel Page (s) Ella Spaulding	Australia	8:06.99	FC
6	(b) Seong Ju-yeong (s) Lee Su-yeon	South Korea	8:47.10	FC

==== Heat 3 ====
Rank	Rowers	Country	Time	Notes
1	(b) Jessy Vermeer (s) Iris van den Berg	Netherlands	7:40.57	Q
2	(b) Mariya Chernets (s) Roza Kenges	Kazakhstan	7:50.26	Q
3	(b) Pepper Howe (s) Catherine Chénier-Gagnon	Canada	7:50.88	Q
4	(b) Viktória Zruttová (s) Anna Kublová	Slovakia	7:58.37	Q
5	(b) Viktoriia Savenkova (s) Anastasiia Kozyr	Ukraine	8:22.27	FC

=== Semifinals ===
The three fastest boats in each heat advanced directly to the final A. The remaining boats were sent to the final B.

==== Semifinal 1 ====
Rank	Rowers	Country	Time	Notes
1	(b) Rebekah Court (s) Rachel Bradley	Great Britain	7:17.04	Q
2	(b) Jessy Vermeer (s) Iris van den Berg	Netherlands	7:18.95	Q
3	(b) Tereza Hrbáčková (s) Marie Doležalová	Czech Republic	7:25.14	Q
4	(b) Roza Kenges (s) Mariya Chernets	Kazakhstan	7:26.52	FB
5	(b) Morgan Zahner (s) Annelise Norkitis	United States	7:29.03	FB
6	(b) Yuka Kishimoto (s) Hinako Ino	Japan	7:30.07	FB

==== Semifinal 2 ====
Rank	Rowers	Country	Time	Notes
1	(b) Wiktoria Kalinowska (s) Barbara Jęchorek	Poland	7:18.39	Q
2	(b) Hannah Matehaere (s) Madison Neale	New Zealand	7:21.50	Q
3	(b) Elena Sali (s) Sara Borghi	Italy	7:22.58	Q
4	(b) Pepper Howe (s) Catherine Chénier-Gagnon	Canada	7:31.17	FB
5	(b) Janka Zsiros (s) Viktória Harsányi	Hungary	7:36.12	FB
6	(b) Viktória Zruttová (s) Anna Kublová	Slovakia	7:47.54	FB

=== Finals ===
The A final determined the rankings for places 1 to 6. Additional rankings were determined in the other finals.

==== Final C ====
Rank	Rowers	Country	Time	Total rank
1	(b) Lea Farac (s) Nina Farac	Croatia	7:33.15	13
2	(b) Liesel Page (s) Ella Spaulding	Australia	7:34.46	14
3	(b) Karla Remacha (s) Lidia Florido	Spain	7:35.87	15
4	(b) Viktoriia Savenkova (s) Anastasiia Kozyr	Ukraine	7:50.53	16
5	(b) Seong Ju-yeong (s) Lee Su-yeon	South Korea	8:05.53	17

==== Final B ====
Rank	Rowers	Country	Time	Total rank
1	(b) Pepper Howe (s) Catherine Chénier-Gagnon	Canada	7:27.85	7
2	(b) Janka Zsiros (s) Viktória Harsányi	Hungary	7:29.25	8
3	(b) Yuka Kishimoto (s) Hinako Ino	Japan	7:30.24	9
4	(b) Morgan Zahner (s) Annelise Norkitis	United States	7:30.91	10
5	(b) Roza Kenges (s) Mariya Chernets	Kazakhstan	7:33.62	11
6	(b) Viktória Zruttová (s) Anna Kublová	Slovakia	7:35.26	12

==== Final A ====
Rank	Rowers	Country	Time	Notes
1st place, gold medalist(s)	(b) Elena Sali (s) Sara Borghi	Italy	7:32.51	
2nd place, silver medalist(s)	(b) Jessy Vermeer (s) Iris van den Berg	Netherlands	7:34.42	
3rd place, bronze medalist(s)	(b) Wiktoria Kalinowska (s) Barbara Jęchorek	Poland	7:34.74	
4	(b) Rebekah Court (s) Rachel Bradley	Great Britain	7:37.17	
5	(b) Hannah Matehaere (s) Madison Neale	New Zealand	7:42.24	
6	(b) Tereza Hrbáčková (s) Marie Doležalová	Czech Republic	7:46.43	
