= Sofia Bordinskikh =

Ukrainian martial artist (born 2003)

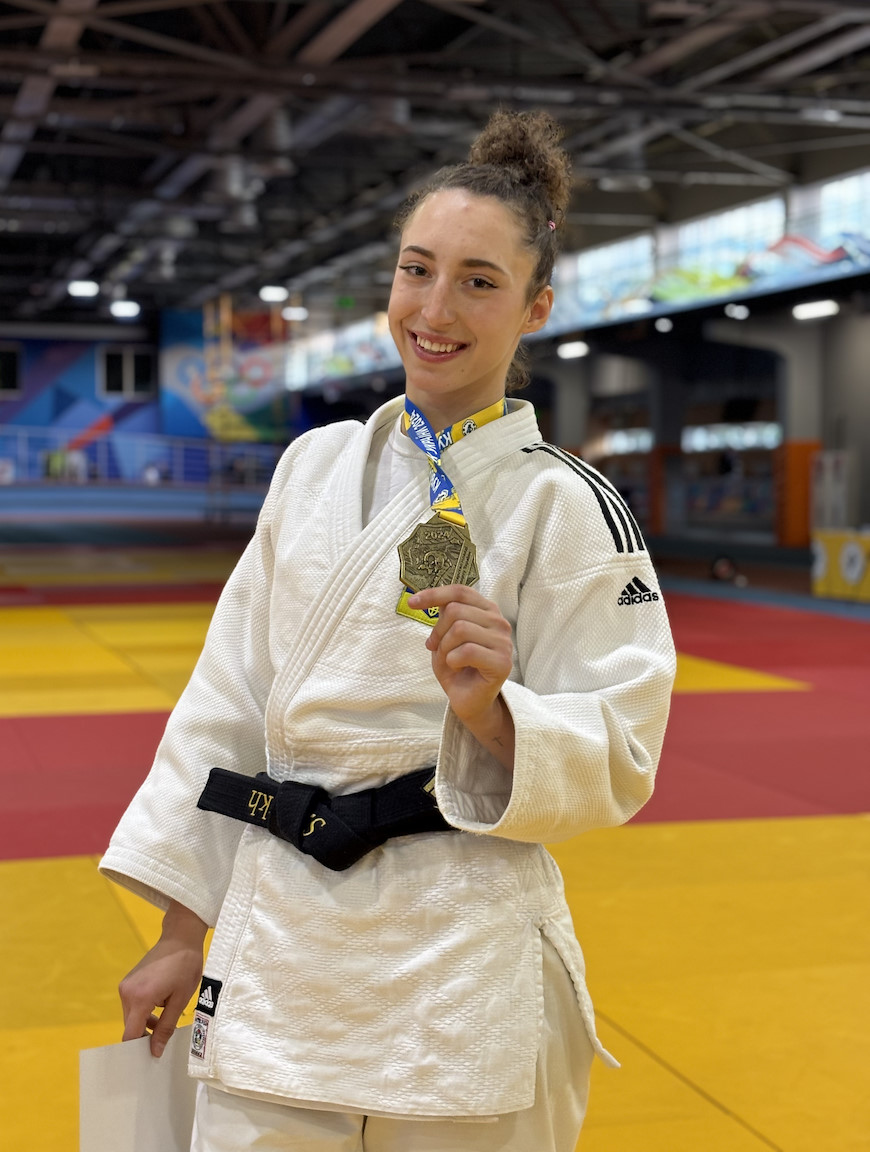

Personal information
- Native name: Софія Вадимівна Бордінських
- Citizenship: Ukraine
- Born: 7 September 2003 (age 22) Zhovti Vody, Dnipropetrovsk region, Ukraine
- Education: Dnieper State Academy of Physical Culture and Sports
- Height: 175 cm (5 ft 9 in)
- Weight: 57 kg (126 lb)
- Parents: Vadim Anatolyevich Bordinskikh (father); Galina Grigoryevna Bordinskikh (mother)

Sport
- Sport: sambo, judo, sumo
- Coached by: E. A. Shutenko
Medal record
Women's sumo
Representing Ukraine
European Championships
Bronze medal – third place	2022 Kwidzyn	‍–‍60 kg
Gold medal – first place	2023 Kraków	‍–‍60 kg
Gold medal – first place	2024 Suwałki	‍–‍60 kg

Sofia Vadimovna Bordinskikh (born September 7, 2003, Zhovti Vody, Dnipropetrovsk region, Ukraine) is a Ukrainian sambo practitioner, judoka and rikishi, Master of Sports of Ukraine in these sports.

== Biography ==
She was born to Vadim Anatolyevich and Galina Grigoryevna Bordinskikh. Her brothers are involved in wrestling. She has been involved in this sport since the age of 4. At the junior sambo championships, she took 1st place in 2019, 3rd place in 2020, and 1st place in 2021. In November 2023, she took second place in the Ukrainian Judo Championship.

== Non-Olympic sports ==
Participates in beach wrestling, Master of Sports of Ukraine, World Class.

- 2021 Ukrainian Sambo Championships — (bronze)
- 2024 World Beach Wrestling Championships — (silver)
