= Moldova at the 2025 Summer World University Games =

- Flag of Moldova
- IOC code: MDA
- National federation: University Sports Federation of Moldova

in Rhine-Ruhr, Germany 16 July 2025 – 27 July 2025
- Competitors: 31 in 9 sports
- Flag bearer: Adil Osmanov (judo)
- Medals Ranked 29th: Gold 2 Silver 0 Bronze 0 Total 2

Summer World University Games appearances
- 1959; 1961; 1963; 1965; 1967; 1970; 1973; 1975; 1977; 1979; 1981; 1983; 1985; 1987; 1989; 1991; 1993; 1995; 1997; 1999; 2001; 2003; 2005; 2007; 2009; 2011; 2013; 2015; 2017; 2019; 2021; 2025; 2027

Moldova competed at the 2025 Summer World University Games in Rhine-Ruhr, Germany held from 16 to 27 July 2025. Moldova was represented by 31 athletes and took twenty-ninth place in the medal table with two medals. Adil Osmanov (judo) was a flag berarer at the opening ceremony.

== Medal summary ==
=== Medal by sports ===
Rank	Sports	Gold	Silver	Bronze	Total
1	Judo	1	0	0	1
1	Rowing	1	0	0	1
Totals (2 entries)		2	0	0	2

Source: rhineruhr2025.com

=== Medalists ===
Medal	Name	Sport	Event	Date
Gold	Adil Osmanov	Judo	Men -73 kg	24 July
Gold	Ivan Corșunov	Rowing	Men's single sculls	27 July
