= Georgia at the 2025 Summer World University Games =

- Flag of Georgia
- IOC code: GEO
- National federation: University Sports Federation of Georgia

in Rhine-Ruhr, Germany 16 July 2025 – 27 July 2025
- Medals Ranked 30th: Gold 1 Silver 3 Bronze 1 Total 5

Summer World University Games appearances
- 1959; 1961; 1963; 1965; 1967; 1970; 1973; 1975; 1977; 1979; 1981; 1983; 1985; 1987; 1989; 1991; 1993; 1995; 1997; 1999; 2001; 2003; 2005; 2007; 2009; 2011; 2013; 2015; 2017; 2019; 2021; 2025; 2027

Georgia competed at the 2025 Summer World University Games in Rhine-Ruhr, Germany held from 16 to 27 July 2025. Georgia took thirtieth place in the medal table with five medals.

== Medal summary ==
=== Medal by sports ===
Rank	Sports	Gold	Silver	Bronze	Total
1	Taekwondo	1	0	0	1
2	Judo	0	3	1	4
Totals (2 entries)		1	3	1	5

Source: rhineruhr2025.com

=== Medalists ===
Medal	Name	Sport	Event	Date
Gold	Zurab Kintsurashvili	Taekwondo	Men -74kg	21 July
Silver	Zaur Dvalashvili	Judo	Men -81 kg	24 July
Silver	Nika Kharazishvili	Judo	Men -100 kg	25 July
Silver	Saba Inaneishvili	Judo	Men +100 kg	25 July
Bronze	Sophio Somkhishvili	Judo	Women +78 kg	25 July
