= Table tennis at the 2025 Summer Universiade – Men's singles =

Men's singles at the 2025 Summer World University Games
- Venue: Messe Essen
- Location: Essen
- Dates: 19―21 July (group stage); 21―24 July (finals)
- Competitors: 133 from 48 nations

Medalists
gold medal	Vladimir Sidorenko	Individual Neutral Athletes
silver medal	Maksim Grebnev	Individual Neutral Athletes
bronze medal	Eduard Ionescu	Romania
bronze medal	Sun Zheng	China

The men's singles at the 2025 Summer World University Games in Rhine-Ruhr, Germany was held from 19 to 24 July 2025. Vladimir Sidorenko from Individual Neutral Athletes won the gold medal. Maksim Grebnev from Individual Neutral Athletes earned the silver medal. The two bronze medals were awarded to Eduard Ionescu from Romania and Sun Zheng from China.

== Schedule ==
All times are Central European Time (UTC+1)

Date	Round
19 July	Group Stage
20 July	Group Stage
21 July	Group Stage
21 July	Preliminary Round
22 July	Round of 64
22 July	Round of 32
23 July	Round of 16
23 July	Quarterfinals
24 July	Semifinals
24 July	Final

== Groups stage ==
Competitors were divided into initial round-robin qualification groups. Players faced everyone in their assigned group, with top performers advancing to the main tournament bracket.

Qualified for Round of 64
Qualified for Round of 128

=== Group 1 ===
Rank	Athlete	W	L	GW	GL	PW	PL	FRA	BEL	NED
1	Bastien Rembert (FRA)	2	0	6	1	76	42	X	3–1	3–0
2	Louis Laffineur (BEL)	1	1	4	3	60	61	1–3	X	3–0
3	Daan Sanders (NED)	0	2	0	6	33	66	0–3	0–3	X

=== Group 2 ===
Rank	Athlete	W	L	GW	GL	PW	PL	GER	CHN	SGP
1	Matthias Danzer (GER)	2	0	6	1	84	61	X	3–1	3–0
2	Ao Hualei (CHN)	1	1	4	3	77	74	1–3	X	3–0
3	Dominic Koh (SGP)	0	2	0	6	40	66	0–3	0–3	X

=== Group 3 ===
Rank	Athlete	W	L	GW	GL	PW	PL	KAZ	HUN	LBA
1	Aidos Kenzhigulov (KAZ)	2	0	6	0	66	29	X	3–0	3–0
2	Dávid Molnár (HUN)	1	1	3	3	54	40	0–3	X	3–0
3	Wiam Al-Gallal (LBA)	0	2	0	6	15	66	0–3	0–3	X

=== Group 4 ===
Rank	Athlete	W	L	GW	GL	PW	PL	CHN	USA	EST
1	Sun Zheng (CHN)	2	0	6	0	66	18	X	3–0	3–0
2	Ved Sheth (USA)	1	1	3	3	45	50	0–3	X	3–0
3	Madis Moos (EST)	0	2	0	6	23	66	0–3	0–3	X

=== Group 5 ===
Rank	Athlete	W	L	GW	GL	PW	PL	SVK	PAK	PHI
1	Jakub Zelinka (SVK)	2	0	6	0	66	35	X	3–0	3–0
2	Syed Shah (PAK)	1	1	3	4	60	70	0–3	X	3–1
3	Rafael Misa (PHI)	0	2	1	6	57	78	0–3	1–3	X

=== Group 6 ===
Rank	Athlete	W	L	GW	GL	PW	PL	SGP	HKG	AUS
1	Josh Chua (SGP)	2	0	6	0	66	31	X	3–0	3–0
2	Shih Wing Hang (HKG)	1	1	3	3	58	60	0–3	X	3–0
3	Andrew Choi (AUS)	0	2	0	6	36	69	0–3	0–3	X

=== Group 7 ===
Rank	Athlete	W	L	GW	GL	PW	PL	DEN	COL	NEP
1	Martin Andersen (DEN)	2	0	6	0	66	23	X	3–0	3–0
2	Campo Montealegre (COL)	1	1	3	3	46	51	0–3	X	3–0
3	Ritiz Joshi (NEP)	0	2	0	6	28	66	0–3	0–3	X

=== Group 8 ===
Rank	Athlete	W	L	GW	GL	PW	PL	SUI	COL	AUS
1	Loïc Stoll (SUI)	2	0	6	0	66	21	X	3–0	3–0
2	Camilo González (COL)	1	1	3	4	54	60	0–3	X	3–1
3	Raymond Myrteza (AUS)	0	2	1	6	37	76	0–3	1–3	X

=== Group 9 ===
Rank	Athlete	W	L	GW	GL	PW	PL	MAC	UZB	AZE
1	He Chon Fai (MAC)	2	0	6	1	71	41	X	3–1	3–0
2	Shokhrukh Iskandarov (UZB)	1	1	4	3	65	59	1–3	X	3–0
3	Nihad Samadzade (AZE)	0	2	0	6	30	66	0–3	0–3	X

=== Group 10 ===
Rank	Athlete	W	L	GW	GL	PW	PL	ROU	KSA	COL
1	Darius Toma (ROU)	2	0	6	0	68	43	X	3–0	3–0
2	Salem Al-Suwailem (KSA)	1	1	3	5	70	80	0–3	X	3–2
3	Nicolás González (COL)	0	2	2	6	72	87	0–3	2–3	X

=== Group 11 ===
Rank	Athlete	W	L	GW	GL	PW	PL	KSA	PHI	AZE
1	Khalid Al-Shareif (KSA)	2	0	6	1	75	49	X	3–1	3–0
2	Andrie Caballes (PHI)	1	1	4	3	69	48	1–3	X	3–0
3	Tural Mirzayev (AZE)	0	2	0	6	19	66	0–3	0–3	X

=== Group 12 ===
Rank	Athlete	W	L	GW	GL	PW	PL	MAC	KOR	LBA
1	Chan Chi In (MAC)	2	0	6	0	66	40	X	3–0	3–0
2	Kang Yu-been (KOR)	1	1	3	3	56	46	0–3	X	3–0
3	Salem Muftah (LBA)	0	2	0	6	30	66	0–3	0–3	X

=== Group 13 ===
Rank	Athlete	W	L	GW	GL	PW	PL	JPN	MAC	QAT
1	Shunsuke Okano (JPN)	2	0	6	0	66	33	X	3–0	3–0
2	He Cunzhao (MAC)	1	1	3	3	48	52	0–3	X	3–0
3	Yousof Aly (QAT)	0	2	0	6	37	66	0–3	0–3	X

=== Group 14 ===
Rank	Athlete	W	L	GW	GL	PW	PL	AIN	BEL	TUR
1	Vladimir Sidorenko (AIN)	2	0	6	0	66	29	X	3–0	3–0
2	Nicolas Degros (BEL)	1	1	3	5	67	87	0–3	X	3–2
3	Tugay Yılmaz (TUR)	0	2	2	6	72	89	0–3	2–3	X

=== Group 15 ===
Rank	Athlete	W	L	GW	GL	PW	PL	USA	QAT	OMA
1	Kai Zarehbin (USA)	2	0	6	2	79	63	X	3–2	3–0
2	Abdullah Abdulwahhab (QAT)	1	1	5	3	77	55	2–3	X	3–0
3	Moath Al-Shahi (OMA)	0	2	0	6	28	66	0–3	0–3	X

=== Group 16 ===
Rank	Athlete	W	L	GW	GL	PW	PL	KOR	SGP	UZB
1	Lee Dong-hyuk (KOR)	2	0	6	2	82	61	X	3–0	3–2
2	Yang Ze Yi (SGP)	1	1	3	4	68	67	0–3	X	3–1
3	Ruzimukhammad Rakhmonov (UZB)	0	2	3	6	72	94	2–3	1–3	X

=== Group 17 ===
Rank	Athlete	W	L	GW	GL	PW	PL	TUR	IND	MGL
1	Uğurcan Dursun (TUR)	2	0	6	1	75	40	X	3–1	3–0
2	Harkunwar Singh (IND)	1	1	4	3	64	62	1–3	X	3–0
3	Enkhmend Munkhbat (MGL)	0	2	0	6	31	68	0–3	0–3	X

=== Group 18 ===
Rank	Athlete	W	L	GW	GL	PW	PL	TPE	THA	CYP
1	Chang Ping-cheng (TPE)	2	0	6	2	82	63	X	3–2	3–0
2	Napat Thanmathikom (THA)	1	1	5	3	80	62	2–3	X	3–0
3	Christos Savva (CYP)	0	2	0	6	29	66	0–3	0–3	X

=== Group 19 ===
Rank	Athlete	W	L	GW	GL	PW	PL	MAC	PAK	CYP
1	Vong Iek Kan (MAC)	2	0	6	2	85	51	X	3–2	3–0
2	Muhammad Khan (PAK)	1	1	5	3	67	73	2–3	X	3–0
3	Andreas Ioannides (CYP)	0	2	0	6	38	66	0–3	0–3	X

=== Group 20 ===
Rank	Athlete	W	L	GW	GL	PW	PL	JPN	NED	HKG
1	Kanta Tokuda (JPN)	2	0	6	1	77	56	X	3–0	3–1
2	Lode Hulshof (NED)	1	1	3	5	70	80	0–3	X	3–2
3	Wan Po Ting (HKG)	0	2	3	6	79	90	1–3	2–3	X

=== Group 21 ===
Rank	Athlete	W	L	GW	GL	PW	PL	NED	AUS	NEP
1	Aron Sanders (NED)	2	0	6	0	68	50	X	3–0	3–0
2	Sidney Win (AUS)	1	1	3	3	62	55	0–3	X	3–0
3	Gananjaya Dahal (NEP)	0	2	0	6	42	67	0–3	0–3	X

=== Group 22 ===
Rank	Athlete	W	L	GW	GL	PW	PL	AIN	ECU	AUS
1	Maksim Grebnev (AIN)	2	0	6	0	66	20	X	3–0	3–0
2	Eduardo Molina (ECU)	1	1	3	4	51	67	0–3	X	3–1
3	Rocky Chen (AUS)	0	2	1	6	42	72	0–3	1–3	X

=== Group 23 ===
Rank	Athlete	W	L	GW	GL	PW	PL	MGL	COL	BRA
1	Temuulen Myandal (MGL)	1	1	5	4	90	72	X	2–3	3–1
2	Juan Uribe (COL)	1	1	5	5	88	95	3–2	X	2–3
3	Marco Garlini (BRA)	1	1	4	5	78	89	1–3	3–2	X

=== Group 24 ===
Rank	Athlete	W	L	GW	GL	PW	PL	SUI	TUR	ZAM
1	Barish Moullet (SUI)	2	0	6	0	68	30	X	3–0	3–0
2	Tarik Saim Özbek (TUR)	1	1	3	3	53	50	0–3	X	3–0
3	John Tembo (ZAM)	0	2	0	6	25	66	0–3	0–3	X

=== Group 25 ===
Rank	Athlete	W	L	GW	GL	PW	PL	POL	MGL	IRL
1	Artur Grela (POL)	2	0	6	0	66	27	X	3–0	3–0
2	Manlaijargal Munkh-Ochir (MGL)	1	1	3	3	48	49	0–3	X	3–0
3	Ben Watson (IRL)	0	2	0	6	28	66	0–3	0–3	X

=== Group 26 ===
Rank	Athlete	W	L	GW	GL	PW	PL	JPN	SUI	IND
1	Yuma Tanigaki (JPN)	2	0	6	1	78	51	X	3–1	3–0
2	Mauro Scharrer (SUI)	1	1	4	4	74	80	1–3	X	3–1
3	Devarsh Vaghela (IND)	0	2	1	6	62	83	0–3	1–3	X

=== Group 27 ===
Rank	Athlete	W	L	GW	GL	PW	PL	THA	CAN	CHI
1	Punnatat Tungbovornphichet (THA)	2	0	6	0	67	38	X	3–0	3–0
2	Kevin Guo (CAN)	1	1	3	3	56	52	0–3	X	3–0
3	Pablo Luengo (CHI)	0	2	0	6	33	66	0–3	0–3	X

=== Group 28 ===
Rank	Athlete	W	L	GW	GL	PW	PL	SGP	GER	IRL
1	Jayden Tan (SGP)	2	0	6	1	73	49	X	3–1	3–0
2	Timotius Köchling (GER)	1	1	4	3	66	49	1–3	X	3–0
3	Cillian Kirby (IRL)	0	2	0	6	25	66	0–3	0–3	X

=== Group 29 ===
Rank	Athlete	W	L	GW	GL	PW	PL	HUN	KOR	POR
1	Erik Huzsvár (HUN)	2	0	6	1	75	54	X	3–1	3–0
2	Yun Chang-min (KOR)	1	1	4	4	75	79	1–3	X	3–1
3	José Magalhães (POR)	0	2	1	6	54	71	0–3	1–3	X

=== Group 30 ===
Rank	Athlete	W	L	GW	GL	PW	PL	SVK	CHI	KGZ
1	Jakub Goldír (SVK)	2	0	6	0	66	18	X	3–0	3–0
2	Lucas Llantén (CHI)	1	1	3	3	44	53	0–3	X	3–0
3	Bektemir Osmonov (KGZ)	0	2	0	6	27	66	0–3	0–3	X

=== Group 31 ===
Rank	Athlete	W	L	GW	GL	PW	PL	POL	KSA	IND
1	Szymon Kolasa (POL)	2	0	6	1	75	45	X	3–0	3–1
2	Turki Al-Mutairi (KSA)	1	1	3	5	62	76	0–3	X	3–2
3	Ayaz Murad (IND)	0	2	3	6	76	92	1–3	2–3	X

=== Group 32 ===
Rank	Athlete	W	L	GW	GL	PW	PL	CHI	SRI	OMA
1	Claudio Lonconado (CHI)	2	0	6	1	72	47	X	3–1	3–0
2	Hiruna Warusawithana (SRI)	1	1	4	3	65	55	1–3	X	3–0
3	Bader Al-Jassasi (OMA)	0	2	0	6	31	66	0–3	0–3	X

=== Group 33 ===
Rank	Athlete	W	L	GW	GL	PW	PL	POL	MGL	ZAM
1	Dawid Michna (POL)	2	0	6	0	70	32	X	3–0	3–0
2	Munkhtulga Chintugs (MGL)	1	1	3	3	55	60	0–3	X	3–0
3	Chanda Muma (ZAM)	0	2	0	6	33	66	0–3	0–3	X

=== Group 34 ===
Rank	Athlete	W	L	GW	GL	PW	PL	GER	NED	ECU
1	Kirill Fadeev (GER)	2	0	6	0	66	34	X	3–0	3–0
2	Floris Zur Muhlen (NED)	1	1	3	3	51	44	0–3	X	3–0
3	Elías Jiménez (ECU)	0	2	0	6	27	66	0–3	0–3	X

=== Group 35 ===
Rank	Athlete	W	L	GW	GL	PW	PL	POR	CHI	IRL
1	Gonçalo Gomes (POR)	2	0	6	0	66	25	X	3–0	3–0
2	Nicolás Araya (CHI)	1	1	3	3	50	51	0–3	X	3–0
3	Joe Sheard (IRL)	0	2	0	6	26	66	0–3	0–3	X

=== Group 36 ===
Rank	Athlete	W	L	GW	GL	PW	PL	HUN	KGZ	IND
1	Máté Ócsai (HUN)	2	0	6	0	66	36	X	3–0	3–0
2	Tilek Moldaliev (KGZ)	1	1	3	3	50	53	0–3	X	3–0
3	Chitwan Wadhwa (IND)	0	2	0	6	39	66	0–3	0–3	X

=== Group 37 ===
Rank	Athlete	W	L	GW	GL	PW	PL	CAN	HUN	AZE
1	Terence Yeung (CAN)	2	0	6	0	66	28	X	3–0	3–0
2	Dániel Hőgye (HUN)	1	1	3	3	50	52	0–3	X	3–0
3	Amin Orujzada (AZE)	0	2	0	6	30	66	0–3	0–3	X

=== Group 38 ===
Rank	Athlete	W	L	GW	GL	PW	PL	BEL	POL	IRL
1	David Comeliau (BEL)	2	0	6	3	93	79	X	3–1	3–2
2	Jan Zandecki (POL)	1	1	4	3	34	40	1–3	X	W/O
3	Adam Faulkner (IRL)	0	2	2	6	45	53	2–3	W/O	X

=== Group 39 ===
Rank	Athlete	W	L	GW	GL	PW	PL	USA	KSA	SRI
1	Ryan Wu (USA)	1	1	4	3	64	65	X	1–3	3–0
2	Mohammed Al-Qassab (KSA)	1	1	4	4	76	70	3–1	X	1–3
3	Virunaka Hendahewa (SRI)	1	1	3	4	64	69	0–3	3–1	X

== Knockout stage ==
A single-elimination bracket where losing meant instant elimination. Following FISU tournament standards for major phases, matches in the final tournament bracket were played in a best-of-seven sets format. The first player to reach 11 points (with a 2-point lead) secured a set. In line with standard tournament traditions, both losing semifinalists automatically received a bronze medal without playing a third-place match.

=== Section 1 ===
Round of 128
D Hőgye (HUN)	13	14	11	11
L Llantén (CHI)	11	12	8	6
L Hulshof (NED)	11	5	4	11	7	12
Vong IK (MAC)	9	11	11	9	11	14
S Kolasa (POL)	9	11	11	11	10	11
Yang ZY (SGP)	11	8	3	7	12	6

Round of 64
Kao Cj (TPE)	11	11	11	11
D Hőgye (HUN)	9	5	6	4
D Comeliau (BEL)	12	6	1	7	6
S Okano (JPN)	10	11	11	11	11
K Al-Shareif (KSA)	11	11	11	11
Vong IK (MAC)	6	5	9	2
S Kolasa (POL)	11	11	10	8	6	11	7
Chen Js (CHN)	7	7	12	11	11	6	11

Round of 32
Kao Cj (TPE)	8	11	11	11	11
S Okano (JPN)	11	8	6	9	7
K Al-Shareif (KSA)	7	8	11	5	11
Chen Js (CHN)	11	11	7	11	13

Round of 16
Kao Cj (TPE)	11	11	11	11	12
Chen Js (CHN)	13	8	3	7	10

=== Section 2 ===
Round of 128
Shih WH (HKG)	10	5	8	10
TS Özbek (TUR)	12	11	11	12
T Myandal (MGL)	11	11	12	1	9	7	4
V Sheth (USA)	8	2	10	11	11	11	11
M Al-Qassab (KSA)	8	11	7	7	8
E Huzsvár (HUN)	11	8	11	11	11
N Araya (CHI)	7	5	15	4	11	4
K Guo (CAN)	11	11	13	11	9	11

Round of 64
D Movileanu (ROU)	11	11	11	11
TS Özbek (TUR)	3	6	5	5
V Sheth (USA)	7	8	9	4
V Sidorenko (AIN)	11	11	11	11
B Rembert (FRA)	11	11	8	11	9	11
E Huzsvár (HUN)	7	1	11	2	11	9
K Guo (CAN)	4	3	9	3
Cho Ds (KOR)	11	11	11	11

Round of 32
D Movileanu (ROU)	11	11	11	8	11	9
V Sidorenko (AIN)	13	4	7	11	13	11
B Rembert (FRA)	6	3	5	8
Cho Ds (KOR)	11	11	11	11

Round of 16
V Sidorenko (AIN)	12	11	11	7	6	10	11
Cho Ds (KOR)	10	5	5	11	11	12	9

=== Section 3 ===
Round of 128
Ao Hl (CHN)	11	11	11	11
F Zur Muhlen (NED)	5	5	5	4
Chang Pc (TPE)	11	11	11	11
S Win (AUS)	6	9	4	2
T Moldaliev (KGZ)
U Dursun (TUR)	w/o
Y Tanigaki (JPN)	11	11	11	11
S Al-Suwailem (KSA)	3	7	6	1

Round of 64
S Naresh (USA)	11	11	10	11	11	10	11
Ao Hl (CHN)	2	6	12	5	13	12	9
Chang Pc (TPE)	5	11	9	11	11	8	9
M Andersen (DEN)	11	5	11	9	5	11	11
L Stoll (SUI)	11	7	11	9	11	11
U Dursun (TUR)	7	11	7	11	5	6
Y Tanigaki (JPN)	11	11	11	11
Yiu KT (HKG)	8	3	7	7

Round of 32
S Naresh (USA)	11	11	6	11	11
M Andersen (DEN)	6	9	11	9	7
L Stoll (SUI)	7	4	6	8
Y Tanigaki (JPN)	11	11	11	11

Round of 16
S Naresh (USA)	11	11	11	7	11
Y Tanigaki (JPN)	8	8	8	11	7

=== Section 4 ===
Round of 128
A Abdulwahhab (QAT)	11	7	4	7	3
J Tan (SGP)	6	11	11	11	11
D Michna (POL)	11	11	11	13
M Munkh-Ochir (MGL)	4	5	6	11
S Iskandarov (UZB)	11	11	11	11
C Lonconado (CHI)	3	5	1	7
D Molnár (HUN)	11	11	11	11
E Molina (ECU)	8	9	5	3

Round of 64
B Oehme (GER)	11	4	7	11	11	11
J Tan (SGP)	6	11	11	9	8	8
D Michna (POL)	11	11	2	11	5	2	11
J Zelinka (SVK)	9	5	11	4	11	11	2
Chan CI (MAC)	7	11	5	11	12	14
S Iskandarov (UZB)	11	8	11	8	10	12
D Molnár (HUN)	7	7	6	5
E Ionescu (ROU)	11	11	11	11

Round of 32
B Oehme (GER)	8	11	11	11	11	8
D Michna (POL)	11	4	13	8	13	11
Chan CI (MAC)	7	11	5	4	3
E Ionescu (ROU)	11	8	11	11	11

Round of 16
D Michna (POL)	8	4	7	8
E Ionescu (ROU)	11	11	11	11

=== Section 5 ===
Round of 128
J Uribe (COL)	5	5	8	9
J Zandecki (POL)	11	11	11	11
M Grebnev (AIN)	11	11	11	11
T Al-Mutairi (KSA)	7	6	1	4
H Warusawithana (SRI)	4	5	3	5
P Tungbovornphichet (THA)	11	11	11	11
A Sanders (NED)	7	7	13	6
L Laffineur (BEL)	11	11	15	11

Round of 64
Zeng Bx (CHN)	11	11	13	12	11
J Zandecki (POL)	6	13	11	10	8
M Grebnev (AIN)	12	6	11	12	11	14
J Chua (SGP)	10	11	5	14	9	12
Lee Dh (KOR)	11	13	12	3	8	11
P Tungbovornphichet (THA)	9	11	10	11	11	5
L Laffineur (BEL)	8	5	5	7
V Picard (FRA)	11	11	11	11

Round of 32
Zeng Bx (CHN)	11	8	6	10	11	11	4
M Grebnev (AIN)	7	11	11	12	7	8	11
Lee Dh (KOR)	6	11	5	7	8
V Picard (FRA)	11	5	11	11	11

Round of 16
M Grebnev (AIN)	7	11	11	11	8	11
V Picard (FRA)	11	6	8	2	11	7

=== Section 6 ===
Round of 128
M Scharrer (SUI)	8	8	11	16	11	5	8
K Fadeev (GER)	11	11	9	14	3	11	11
R Wu (USA)	w/o
A Caballes (PHI)
C Montealegre (COL)	5	7	9	7
K Tokuda (JPN)	11	11	11	11
Yun Cm (KOR)	12	11	11	11
S Shah (PAK)	10	5	3	6

Round of 64
D Araya (CRC)	2	1	5	3
K Fadeev (GER)	11	11	11	11
R Wu (USA)	5	7	8	9
He CF (MAC)	11	11	11	11
D Toma (ROU)	11	7	11	7	11	11
K Tokuda (JPN)	9	11	8	11	7	6
Yun Cm (KOR)	12	11	10	13	13	8	2
Huang Yc (TPE)	10	7	12	15	11	11	11

Round of 32
K Fadeev (GER)	11	11	11	6	11
He CF (MAC)	8	5	8	11	6
D Toma (ROU)	11	11	5	11	11
Huang Yc (TPE)	9	5	11	6	6

Round of 16
K Fadeev (GER)	11	15	11	11
D Toma (ROU)	7	13	8	7

=== Section 7 ===
Round of 128
M Khan (PAK)	6	10	6	5
C González (COL)	11	12	11	11
M Ócsai (HUN)	5	13	9	12	8
N Degros (BEL)	11	11	11	14	11
Kang Yb (KOR)	11	11	11	9	7	11
J Goldír (SVK)	5	6	8	11	11	9
A Grela (POL)	11	11	12	11
He Cz (MAC)	3	8	10	7

Round of 64
B Chan (HKG)	11	11	11	12
C González (COL)	2	6	5	10
N Degros (BEL)	10	11	6	9	7
Sun Z (CHN)	12	8	11	11	11
M Danzer (GER)	11	9	6	11	11	7	11
Kang Yb (KOR)	7	11	11	5	7	11	7
A Grela (POL)	2	6	11	9	13
J Yokotani (JPN)	11	11	9	11	15

Round of 32
B Chan (HKG)	5	11	11	9	11	9	8
Sun Z (CHN)	11	5	6	11	8	11	11
M Danzer (GER)	6	7	11	11	7	6
J Yokotani (JPN)	11	11	3	4	11	11

Round of 16
Sun Z (CHN)	11	11	6	11	7	11
J Yokotani (JPN)	5	5	11	2	11	3

=== Section 8 ===
Round of 128
T Köchling (GER)	13	11	11	11
G Gomes (POR)	11	9	9	9
B Moulret (SUI)	11	3	6	4	9
N Thanmathikom (THA)	9	11	11	11	11
M Chintugs (MGL)	2	1	3	6
H Singh (IND)	11	11	11	11

Round of 64
A Istrate (ROU)	11	13	11	9	11
T Köchling (GER)	3	11	5	11	9
N Thanmathikom (THA)	11	11	11	11
K Zarehbin (USA)	7	3	4	3
A Kenzhigulov (KAZ)	11	11	11	11
T Yeung (CAN)	7	7	5	8
H Singh (IND)	3	4	8	4
Feng Yh (TPE)	11	11	11	11

Round of 32
A Istrate (ROU)	11	11	12	8	11	6	16
N Thanmathikom (THA)	6	8	14	11	7	11	14
A Kenzhigulov (KAZ)	6	5	11	8	6
Feng Yh (TPE)	11	11	9	11	11

Round of 16
A Istrate (ROU)	9	3	7	8
Feng Yh (TPE)	11	11	11	11

=== Finals ===
Quarterfinals
Kao Cj (TPE)	11	12	7	8	8	2
V Sidorenko (AIN)	8	10	11	11	11	11
S Naresh (USA)	3	12	9	13	4
E Ionescu (ROU)	11	10	11	15	11
M Grebnev (AIN)	11	8	11	10	11	6	11
K Fadeev (GER)	9	11	3	12	5	11	8
Sun Z (CHN)	11	9	7	13	10	11	11
YH Feng (TPE)	8	11	11	11	12	8	8

Semifinals
V Sidorenko (AIN)	11	14	11	11
E Ionescu (ROU)	6	12	6	8
M Grebnev (AIN)	11	16	7	5	11	11
Sun Z (CHN)	9	14	11	11	9	7

Final
V Sidorenko (AIN)	10	11	11	11	11
M Grebnev (AIN)	12	8	8	6	6
