= Swimming at the 2025 Summer World University Games – Men's 400 metre freestyle =

Men's 400 metre freestyle at the 2025 Summer World University Games
- Venue: Schwimm- und Sprunghalle im Europasportpark
- Location: Berlin
- Dates: 17 July (heats and final)
- Competitors: 35 from 26 nations

Medalists
gold medal	Nikolai Kolesnikov	Individual Neutral Athletes
silver medal	Khiew Hoe Yean	Malaysia
bronze medal	Ryan Erisman	United States

The men's 400 metre freestyle at the 2025 Summer World University Games in Rhine-Ruhr, Germany was held 17 July 2025. Nikolai Kolesnikov from Individual Neutral Athletes won the gold medal, Khiew Hoe Yean from Malaysia took the silver medal and Ryan Erisman from the United States earned the bronze medal.

== Schedule ==
All times are Central European Time (UTC+1)

Date	Time	Round
17 July	09:00	Heats
17 July	19:00	Final

== Records ==
Prior to the competition, the world and Universiade records were as follows.

Category	Swimmer	Record	Date	Place	Event
World record	(Germany) Lukas Märtens	3:39.96	12 April 2025	Stockholm, Sweden	2025 Stockholm Open
Universiade record	(Ukraine) Mykhailo Romanchuk	3:45.96	20 August 2017	Taipei, Chinese Taipei	2017 Summer Universiade

== Results ==
=== Heats ===
All entered athletes competed across multiple seeded heats in the morning session. Swimmers with the top 8 fastest times advanced, regardless of which individual heat they swam.

Rank	Heat	Lane	Swimmer	Nation	Time	Notes
1	5	6	Nikolai Kolesnikov	Individual Neutral Athletes	3:48.75	Q
2	5	4	Ryan Erisman	United States	3:48.81	Q
3	4	4	Eduardo Moraes	Brazil	3:48.84	Q
4	5	5	Khiew Hoe Yean	Malaysia	3:50.13	Q
5	4	2	Davide Marchello	Italy	3:50.43	Q
6	4	3	Kyo Nakayama	Japan	3:50.94	Q
7	5	1	Leonardo Alcantara	Brazil	3:51.01	Q
8	4	5	Alec Enyeart	United States	3:51.32	Q
9	5	7	Daichi Yamamoto	Japan	3:51.42	
10	5	8	Tommaso Griffante	Italy	3:51.44	
11	5	2	Pierre Largeron	France	3:51.58	
12	4	7	Simon Reinke	Germany	3:54.11	
13	4	8	Nicolás García	Spain	3:54.23	
14	3	6	Cameron Casali	South Africa	3:54.70	
15	3	5	Heorhii Lukashev	Ukraine	3:54.88	
16	3	4	Righardt Muller	South Africa	3:56.04	
17	4	1	Daniel Eichel	Israel	3:56.90	
18	2	6	Ilan Gagnebin	Switzerland	3:56.95	
19	5	3	Ahmet Isik	Turkey	3:57.65	
20	3	3	Cho Seung-been	South Korea	3:57.67	
21	4	6	Roman Akimov	Individual Neutral Athletes	3:59.07	
22	3	1	Aneesh Sunil	India	3:59.45	
23	2	5	Michal Judickij	Czech Republic	3:59.55	
24	3	7	Mattia Mauri	Switzerland	4:00.28	
25	2	4	Arne Furlan	Slovenia	4:02.30	
26	3	8	Sebastian Muñoz	Colombia	4:02.62	
27	3	2	Brandon Yap	Singapore	4:02.96	
28	2	3	Luis Corona	Mexico	4:05.42	
29	2	7	Shivank Vishwanath	India	4:06.61	
30	2	2	Tudor Vartic	Moldova	4:12.75	
31	2	1	Kaeden Gleason	Virgin Islands	4:14.29	
32	2	8	Daniel Luzuriaga	Ecuador	4:26.15	
33	1	4	Victor Jiménez	Ecuador	4:39.80	
34	1	5	Ayan Asif	Pakistan	5:23.04	
35	1	3	Juan Silva	Argentina	5:27.37	

=== Final ===
The fastest 8 swimmers competed in a single race to determine the gold, silver and bronze medalists.

Rank	Lane	Swimmer	Nation	Time	Notes
1st place, gold medalist(s)	4	Nikolai Kolesnikov	Individual Neutral Athletes	3:46.66	
2nd place, silver medalist(s)	6	Khiew Hoe Yean	Malaysia	3:47.38	
3rd place, bronze medalist(s)	5	Ryan Erisman	United States	3:47.52	
4	2	Davide Marchello	Italy	3:47.88	
5	3	Eduardo Moraes	Brazil	3:47.97	
6	1	Leonardo Alcantara	Brazil	3:49.96	
7	8	Alec Enyeart	United States	3:50.06	
8	7	Kyo Nakayama	Japan	3:52.45	
