= Fencing at the 2025 Summer World University Games – Men's individual épée =

Men's individual épée at the 2025 Summer World University Games
- Venue: Messe Essen
- Location: Essen
- Dates: 18 July
- Competitors: 115 from 38 nations

Medalists
gold medal	Dmitrii Shvelidze	Individual Neutral Athletes
silver medal	Soma Somody	Hungary
bronze medal	Kirill Gurov	Individual Neutral Athletes
bronze medal	Sven Vineis	Switzerland

The men's individual épée at the 2025 Summer World University Games in Rhine-Ruhr, Germany was held 18 July 2025. The gold medal was won by Dmitrii Shvelidze, competing as an Individual Neutral Athlete, while the silver medal went to Soma Somody of Hungary, and the two bronze medals were shared by Sven Vineis of Switzerland and Kirill Gurov, also competing as an Individual Neutral Athlete.

== Pool Results ==
115 fencers were divided into small round-robin groups of 6 to 7 competitors. Every athlete fought against everyone else within their assigned group. Individual pool bouts were contested to 5 touches or a 3-minute time limit. Results from this phase established an overall seeding rank. The lowest-performing fencers were eliminated immediately.

Qualified for Table of 64
Qualified for Table of 128

=== Pool 1 ===
#	Seed	Athlete	1	2	3	4	5	6	7	V#	M#	Ind.	TG	TR	Diff.	RP
1	69	Thomas Dahlbo (NOR)		D_{3}	D_{3}	D_{3}	D_{0}	V_{5}	V_{5}	2	6	0.333	19	26	-7	5
2	35	Itamar Tavor (ISR)	V_{5}		V_{5}	V_{3}	V_{5}	V_{5}	V_{5}	6	6	1.000	28	15	13	1
3	1	Ryu Matsumoto (JPN)	V_{5}	D_{4}		V_{5}	V_{4}	V_{5}	V_{3}	5	6	0.833	26	15	11	2
4	102	Sumiyabaldan Gonchigbal (MGL)	V_{5}	D_{0}	D_{2}		V_{5}	D_{1}	D_{1}	2	6	0.333	14	24	-10	6
5	67	Fabrizio Di Marco (ITA)	V_{5}	D_{3}	D_{1}	D_{3}		V_{5}	V_{5}	3	6	0.500	22	21	1	3
6	104	Daniils Zamkovojs (LAT)	D_{3}	D_{3}	D_{3}	V_{5}	D_{4}		D_{1}	1	6	0.167	19	26	-7	7
7	34	Hassan Abed (KSA)	D_{3}	D_{2}	D_{1}	V_{5}	D_{3}	V_{5}		2	6	0.333	19	20	-1	4

=== Pool 2 ===
#	Seed	Athlete	1	2	3	4	5	6	7	V#	M#	Ind.	TG	TR	Diff.	RP
1	33	Dmitrii Shvelidze (AIN)		V_{5}	V_{5}	V_{5}	V_{5}	D_{4}	D_{3}	4	6	0.667	27	14	13	3
2	101	Lokesh (IND)	D_{2}		V_{5}	V_{5}	D_{4}	D_{1}	D_{1}	2	6	0.333	18	26	-8	5
3	36	Nolan Peterson (NZL)	D_{0}	D_{2}		V_{4}	D_{4}	D_{4}	D_{2}	1	6	0.167	16	27	-11	6
4	103	Ahmed Al-Fihani (KSA)	D_{1}	D_{4}	D_{2}		V_{5}	D_{1}	D_{2}	1	6	0.167	15	26	-11	7
5	68	Gļebs Čaikovskis (LAT)	D_{1}	V_{5}	V_{5}	D_{3}		D_{3}	D_{4}	2	6	0.333	21	28	-7	4
6	2	Simone Mencarelli (ITA)	V_{5}	V_{5}	V_{5}	V_{4}	V_{5}		D_{3}	5	6	0.833	27	18	9	2
7	70	Nam Yeon-ho (KOR)	V_{5}	V_{5}	V_{5}	V_{5}	V_{5}	V_{5}		6	6	1.000	30	15	15	1

=== Pool 3 ===
#	Seed	Athlete	1	2	3	4	5	6	7	V#	M#	Ind.	TG	TR	Diff.	RP
1	100	Jung Seung-ho (KOR)		V_{5}	V_{4}	D_{1}	D_{3}	D_{1}	V_{4}	3	6	0.500	18	16	2	4
2	71	Marcus Brobakken (NOR)	D_{2}		D_{3}	D_{4}	D_{0}	D_{2}	D_{3}	0	6	0.000	14	28	-14	7
3	66	Mika Ehringhaus (GER)	D_{0}	V_{4}		D_{3}	D_{3}	D_{3}	V_{5}	2	6	0.333	18	23	-5	5
4	32	Jan Kardaszewicz (POL)	V_{5}	V_{5}	V_{5}		V_{2}	D_{1}	V_{5}	5	6	0.833	23	14	9	2
5	3	Jonathan Fuhrimann (SUI)	V_{4}	V_{4}	V_{4}	D_{1}		V_{5}	V_{5}	5	6	0.833	23	14	9	2
6	37	Diego Calderón Bartolomé (USA)	V_{5}	V_{5}	V_{4}	V_{2}	D_{4}		V_{5}	5	6	0.833	25	16	9	1
7	105	Luka Mlakar (SLO)	D_{0}	V_{5}	D_{3}	D_{3}	D_{2}	D_{4}		1	6	0.167	17	27	-10	6

=== Pool 4 ===
#	Seed	Athlete	1	2	3	4	5	6	7	V#	M#	Ind.	TG	TR	Diff.	RP
1	72	Bron Sheum (SGP)		V_{5}	V_{5}	V_{5}	D_{4}	D_{0}	V_{4}	4	6	0.667	23	23	0	3
2	99	Noah Blender Greene (AUS)	D_{4}		D_{4}	D_{3}	D_{4}	D_{1}	D_{3}	0	6	0.000	19	30	-11	7
3	39	Matthew Valkenburg (NZL)	D_{3}	V_{5}		V_{5}	D_{3}	D_{2}	D_{1}	2	6	0.333	19	26	-7	6
4	65	Louis Taiwo (GBR)	D_{4}	V_{5}	D_{2}		V_{5}	V_{5}	D_{3}	3	6	0.500	24	26	-2	4
5	107	Khuslen Myagmar (MGL)	V_{5}	V_{5}	V_{5}	D_{4}		D_{3}	D_{0}	3	6	0.500	22	26	-4	5
6	31	Nikita Zhulinskiy (KAZ)	V_{4}	V_{5}	V_{5}	D_{4}	V_{5}		D_{4}	4	6	0.667	27	16	11	2
7	4	Seiya Asami (JPN)	D_{3}	V_{5}	V_{5}	V_{5}	V_{5}	V_{5}		5	6	0.833	28	15	13	1

=== Pool 5 ===
#	Seed	Athlete	1	2	3	4	5	6	7	V#	M#	Ind.	TG	TR	Diff.	RP
1	73	Julius Ruppenthal (GER)		D_{2}	D_{3}	D_{3}	V_{5}	V_{5}	D_{4}	2	6	0.333	22	23	-1	4
2	30	Ilian Bobrov (EST)	V_{5}		V_{3}	D_{0}	D_{1}	V_{4}	V_{5}	4	6	0.667	18	15	3	3
3	64	Reilly Brislawn (USA)	V_{4}	D_{2}		D_{2}	V_{5}	V_{5}	V_{5}	4	6	0.667	23	14	9	2
4	38	Alexandr Fedotov (KAZ)	V_{5}	V_{1}	V_{5}		V_{5}	V_{5}	D_{4}	5	6	0.833	25	15	10	1
5	98	Lars Ponikvar (SLO)	D_{1}	V_{5}	D_{1}	D_{2}		D_{1}	V_{5}	2	6	0.333	15	25	-10	7
6	5	Wiktor Wałach (POL)	D_{3}	D_{3}	D_{0}	D_{3}	V_{5}		V_{5}	2	6	0.333	19	23	-4	5
7	106	Jefferson Cheong (SGP)	V_{5}	D_{2}	D_{2}	V_{5}	D_{4}	D_{3}		2	6	0.333	21	28	-7	6

=== Pool 6 ===
#	Seed	Athlete	1	2	3	4	5	6	7	V#	M#	Ind.	TG	TR	Diff.	RP
1	74	Hidemasa Sakato (JPN)		D_{0}	V_{5}	V_{4}	V_{5}	V_{5}	V_{5}	5	6	0.833	24	9	15	1
2	63	Matěj Salzer (CZE)	V_{5}		D_{1}	D_{4}	V_{5}	V_{5}	V_{5}	4	6	0.667	25	17	8	2
3	6	Soma Somody (HUN)	D_{2}	V_{5}		V_{5}	D_{3}	V_{5}	V_{5}	4	6	0.667	25	18	7	3
4	29	Piotr Urban (POL)	D_{0}	V_{5}	D_{2}		V_{5}	V_{5}	V_{5}	4	6	0.667	22	19	3	4
5	108	Filip Nyman (SWE)	D_{1}	D_{2}	V_{5}	D_{3}		D_{1}	V_{3}	2	6	0.333	15	25	-10	6
6	97	Joel Wilson (NZL)	D_{1}	D_{3}	D_{1}	D_{2}	V_{5}		V_{5}	2	6	0.333	17	23	-6	5
7	40	Ghadi El-Chemaly (LBN)	D_{0}	D_{2}	D_{4}	D_{1}	D_{2}	D_{2}		0	6	0.000	11	28	-17	7

=== Pool 7 ===
#	Seed	Athlete	1	2	3	4	5	6	7	V#	M#	Ind.	TG	TR	Diff.	RP
1	96	Benjamin Kim (USA)		V_{5}	D_{2}	V_{5}	D_{1}	V_{5}	D_{4}	3	6	0.500	22	25	-3	5
2	41	František Coufal (CZE)	D_{4}		V_{5}	D_{0}	D_{2}	D_{1}	D_{3}	1	6	0.167	15	29	-14	7
3	28	Mykhailo Krasniuk (UKR)	V_{5}	D_{4}		V_{5}	V_{4}	V_{5}	D_{4}	4	6	0.667	27	22	5	1
4	109	Mikhail Belozerov (AIN)	D_{4}	V_{5}	D_{4}		V_{5}	D_{3}	V_{5}	3	6	0.500	26	16	10	4
5	75	Wu Hsiang-ching (TPE)	V_{5}	V_{5}	D_{3}	D_{2}		D_{3}	D_{2}	2	6	0.333	20	22	-2	6
6	7	Kruz Schembri (ISV)	D_{2}	V_{5}	D_{3}	V_{4}	V_{5}		V_{3}	4	6	0.667	22	19	3	2
7	61	Tobias Berry (GBR)	V_{5}	V_{5}	V_{5}	D_{0}	V_{5}	D_{2}		4	6	0.667	22	21	1	3

=== Pool 8 ===
#	Seed	Athlete	1	2	3	4	5	6	7	V#	M#	Ind.	TG	TR	Diff.	RP
1	110	Sufyan Sohil (IND)		D_{4}	D_{2}	D_{2}	D_{0}	D_{3}	D_{2}	0	6	0.000	13	28	-15	7
2	76	Hsu Hao (TPE)	V_{5}		D_{3}	V_{5}	D_{1}	D_{0}	V_{5}	3	6	0.500	19	23	-4	5
3	42	Heo In-sub (KOR)	V_{3}	V_{4}		V_{5}	V_{5}	V_{5}	D_{2}	5	6	0.833	24	19	5	2
4	8	Théo Brochard (SUI)	V_{5}	D_{4}	D_{4}		D_{3}	D_{2}	D_{3}	1	6	0.167	21	27	-6	6
5	27	James Jeal (GBR)	V_{5}	V_{5}	D_{1}	V_{5}		D_{3}	V_{5}	4	6	0.667	24	15	9	3
6	62	Ian Bäckström (SWE)	V_{5}	V_{5}	D_{4}	V_{5}	V_{4}		V_{5}	5	6	0.833	28	14	14	1
7	94	Shai Ghivoly (ISR)	V_{5}	D_{1}	V_{5}	V_{5}	D_{2}	D_{1}		3	6	0.500	19	22	-3	4

=== Pool 9 ===
#	Seed	Athlete	1	2	3	4	5	6	7	V#	M#	Ind.	TG	TR	Diff.	RP
1	9	Gergely Kovács (HUN)		V_{5}	V_{5}	V_{5}	V_{5}	D_{3}	V_{5}	5	6	0.833	28	13	15	1
2	78	Jakob Fagerstedt (SWE)	D_{3}		V_{5}	D_{1}	V_{5}	V_{2}	V_{5}	4	6	0.667	21	19	2	4
3	60	Preston Stroop (NED)	D_{2}	D_{3}		V_{3}	D_{3}	D_{4}	V_{4}	2	6	0.333	19	23	-4	5
4	26	Ahmed Hazazi (KSA)	D_{1}	V_{5}	D_{2}		D_{3}	D_{2}	V_{5}	2	6	0.333	18	23	-5	6
5	43	Fedor Khaperskiy (ISR)	D_{2}	D_{3}	V_{5}	V_{5}		V_{5}	V_{5}	4	6	0.667	25	23	2	3
6	95	Logan Dieck (USA)	V_{4}	D_{1}	V_{5}	V_{5}	D_{4}		V_{5}	4	6	0.667	24	17	7	2
7	111	Shankar Pandey (IND)	D_{1}	D_{2}	D_{1}	D_{4}	D_{3}	D_{1}		0	6	0.000	12	29	-17	7

=== Pool 10 ===
#	Seed	Athlete	1	2	3	4	5	6	7	V#	M#	Ind.	TG	TR	Diff.	RP
1	77	Omar Al-Akkas (KSA)		V_{5}	D_{3}	D_{4}	V_{5}	V_{5}	D_{0}	3	6	0.500	22	24	-2	5
2	93	Christiaan Bester (RSA)	D_{4}		V_{5}	V_{5}	V_{5}	V_{5}	D_{1}	4	6	0.667	25	20	5	2
3	59	Diego Erbetta (SUI)	V_{5}	D_{0}		V_{5}	V_{5}	D_{2}	V_{5}	4	6	0.667	22	23	-1	4
4	112	Munkhkhasar Ulaankhuu (MGL)	V_{5}	D_{4}	D_{3}		V_{5}	D_{4}	D_{2}	2	6	0.333	23	28	-5	6
5	44	Maksym Perchuk (UKR)	D_{3}	D_{3}	D_{3}	D_{4}		D_{2}	D_{2}	0	6	0.000	17	30	-13	7
6	25	Konrad Veenenbos (NED)	D_{2}	D_{3}	V_{5}	V_{5}	V_{5}		V_{5}	4	6	0.667	25	21	4	3
7	10	Paul Fortin (FRA)	V_{5}	V_{5}	D_{4}	V_{5}	V_{5}	D_{3}		4	6	0.667	27	15	12	1

=== Pool 11 ===
#	Seed	Athlete	1	2	3	4	5	6	7	V#	M#	Ind.	TG	TR	Diff.	RP
1	11	Rahul Van Manen (RSA)		D_{1}	V_{5}	V_{5}	V_{5}	D_{2}	D_{2}	3	6	0.500	20	20	0	4
2	92	Marko Kuhta (FIN)	V_{5}		D_{3}	D_{2}	V_{5}	V_{5}	D_{3}	3	6	0.500	23	21	2	3
3	79	Tai Wang Chon (MAC)	D_{1}	V_{5}		D_{0}	D_{1}	D_{1}	D_{2}	1	6	0.167	10	28	-18	7
4	45	Valentin Altunin (EST)	D_{2}	V_{5}	V_{5}		V_{5}	V_{5}	V_{5}	5	6	0.833	27	14	13	1
5	58	Ádám Keresztes (HUN)	D_{2}	D_{4}	V_{5}	D_{4}		D_{4}	D_{4}	1	6	0.167	23	26	-3	6
6	113	Leo Kaminer (ISR)	V_{5}	D_{1}	V_{5}	D_{1}	V_{5}		D_{3}	3	6	0.500	20	22	-2	5
7	24	Sven Vineis (SUI)	V_{5}	V_{5}	V_{5}	D_{2}	V_{5}	V_{5}		5	6	0.833	27	19	8	2

=== Pool 12 ===
#	Seed	Athlete	1	2	3	4	5	6	7	V#	M#	Ind.	TG	TR	Diff.	RP
1	91	Joel Ball-La Hood (NZL)		D_{1}	D_{0}	D_{0}	D_{3}	D_{0}	D_{4}	0	6	0.000	8	30	-22	7
2	57	Michael Trebis (GER)	V_{5}		D_{0}	D_{1}	V_{5}	V_{5}	V_{5}	4	6	0.667	21	17	4	4
3	23	Fabrizio Cuomo (ITA)	V_{5}	V_{1}		D_{3}	V_{5}	V_{4}	V_{5}	5	6	0.833	23	6	17	1
4	12	Kendrick Jean-Joseph (FRA)	V_{5}	V_{5}	V_{5}		V_{5}	D_{4}	V_{5}	5	6	0.833	29	16	13	2
5	114	Hengrui Liu (AUS)	V_{5}	D_{3}	D_{0}	D_{4}		D_{3}	V_{5}	2	6	0.333	20	24	-4	5
6	46	Diego Rodríguez (ESP)	V_{5}	D_{3}	D_{1}	V_{5}	V_{5}		V_{5}	4	6	0.667	24	20	4	3
7	81	Simon Bakke (DEN)	V_{5}	D_{4}	D_{0}	D_{3}	D_{1}	D_{4}		1	6	0.167	17	29	-12	6

=== Pool 13 ===
#	Seed	Athlete	1	2	3	4	5	6	7	V#	M#	Ind.	TG	TR	Diff.	RP
1	22	Harry Saner (RSA)		V_{5}	V_{5}	D_{4}	V_{5}	D_{4}	D_{2}	3	6	0.500	25	24	1	3
2	90	Chen Pin-jui (TPE)	D_{3}		D_{0}	V_{5}	D_{3}	D_{3}	D_{0}	1	6	0.167	14	28	-14	7
3	115	Leandro Sauri (MEX)	D_{4}	V_{5}		D_{4}	V_{5}	D_{3}	V_{5}	3	6	0.500	26	21	5	2
4	47	Pavlo Trofymenko (UKR)	V_{5}	D_{3}	V_{5}		D_{3}	D_{4}	V_{5}	3	6	0.500	25	24	1	3
5	13	Kiril Pavlov (KAZ)	D_{2}	V_{5}	D_{4}	V_{5}		V_{5}	D_{3}	3	6	0.500	24	25	-1	6
6	80	Max Straub (GER)	V_{5}	V_{5}	V_{5}	V_{5}	D_{4}		V_{5}	5	6	0.833	29	22	7	1
7	56	Cyrille De Bock (BEL)	V_{5}	V_{5}	D_{2}	D_{1}	V_{5}	D_{3}		3	6	0.500	21	20	1	5

=== Pool 14 ===
#	Seed	Athlete	1	2	3	4	5	6	V#	M#	Ind.	TG	TR	Diff.	RP
1	21	Maruán Osman-Touson (HUN)		V_{4}	D_{3}	V_{3}	V_{5}	D_{3}	3	5	0.600	18	14	4	2
2	48	José Martin (ESP)	D_{3}		V_{3}	V_{5}	D_{4}	D_{3}	2	5	0.400	18	17	1	3
3	89	Lin Wei-chen (TPE)	V_{4}	D_{2}		D_{0}	V_{4}	D_{2}	2	5	0.400	12	19	-7	6
4	55	Nolan Wingerter (FRA)	D_{1}	D_{1}	V_{5}		V_{4}	D_{2}	2	5	0.400	13	16	-3	4
5	82	Jesse Pieper (NED)	D_{1}	V_{5}	D_{3}	D_{3}		V_{5}	2	5	0.400	17	21	-4	5
6	14	Kirill Gurov (AIN)	V_{5}	V_{5}	V_{5}	V_{5}	D_{4}		4	5	0.800	24	15	9	1

=== Pool 15 ===
#	Seed	Athlete	1	2	3	4	5	6	V#	M#	Ind.	TG	TR	Diff.	RP
1	83	Timon Grubar (SLO)		V_{5}	V_{5}	V_{5}	V_{5}	V_{5}	5	5	1.000	25	18	7	1
2	54	Puah Zee Cher (SGP)	D_{4}		D_{4}	D_{4}	D_{2}	D_{2}	0	5	0.000	16	25	-9	6
3	88	Ricardo Sánchez (ESP)	D_{4}	V_{5}		D_{3}	D_{2}	D_{2}	1	5	0.200	16	24	-8	5
4	49	Yuen Nok Man (HKG)	D_{3}	V_{5}	V_{5}		V_{5}	D_{4}	3	5	0.600	22	19	3	3
5	20	Kim Jung-beom (KOR)	D_{3}	V_{5}	V_{5}	D_{2}		D_{3}	2	5	0.400	18	19	-1	4
6	15	Kasper Tafenau (EST)	D_{4}	V_{5}	V_{5}	V_{5}	V_{5}		4	5	0.800	24	16	8	2

=== Pool 16 ===
#	Seed	Athlete	1	2	3	4	5	6	V#	M#	Ind.	TG	TR	Diff.	RP
1	53	Naoshi Nakamoto (JPN)		V_{5}	D_{4}	D_{4}	V_{5}	D_{4}	2	5	0.400	22	20	2	3
2	50	Nicolò Del Contrasto (ITA)	D_{3}		V_{5}	D_{0}	V_{4}	D_{4}	2	5	0.400	16	18	-2	4
3	87	George Dale (AUS)	V_{5}	D_{1}		D_{1}	V_{4}	D_{1}	2	5	0.400	12	19	-7	5
4	19	Akseli Heinämaa (FIN)	V_{5}	V_{5}	V_{5}		D_{1}	D_{1}	3	5	0.600	17	15	2	2
5	84	Olav Eikanger (NOR)	D_{2}	D_{2}	D_{3}	V_{5}		D_{3}	1	5	0.200	15	18	-3	6
6	16	Andrii Opanasenko (UKR)	V_{5}	V_{5}	V_{2}	V_{5}	V_{4}		5	5	1.000	21	13	8	1

=== Pool 17 ===
#	Seed	Athlete	1	2	3	4	5	6	V#	M#	Ind.	TG	TR	Diff.	RP
1	51	Jan Socha (POL)		V_{5}	V_{5}	D_{4}	D_{3}	D_{2}	2	5	0.400	19	20	-1	5
2	86	Aedyn Pratley (AUS)	D_{4}		D_{3}	D_{3}	D_{2}	D_{3}	0	5	0.000	15	25	-10	6
3	85	Balram Joshi (IND)	D_{2}	V_{5}		D_{3}	V_{5}	V_{5}	3	5	0.600	21	20	1	4
4	18	Ng Ting Hin (HKG)	V_{5}	V_{5}	D_{3}		D_{4}	V_{5}	3	5	0.600	22	21	1	3
5	17	Álvaro Fernández (ESP)	V_{4}	V_{5}	D_{4}	V_{5}		V_{5}	4	5	0.800	23	18	5	1
6	52	Tomas Geitung (NOR)	V_{5}	V_{5}	V_{5}	D_{4}	D_{4}		3	5	0.600	23	19	4	2

== Results bracket ==
The remaining fencers advanced to a single-elimination tournament bracket based on their pool seeding. Knockout matches were longer, fought to 15 touches across three 3-minute periods (with 1-minute breaks). If tied after 9 minutes, an extra 1-minute priority minute was added to determine the winner. No third-place playoff match was held. Both losing semifinalists automatically won bronze medals.

=== Section 1 ===
Table of 128
65	S Ghivoly (ISR)	15
64	B Kim (USA)	10
81T	P Stroop (NED)	15
48	A Heinämaa (FIN)	14
49	Ng TH (HKG)	15
80	H Liu (AUS)	4
73	N Wingerter (FRA)	15
55T	H Saner (RSA)	5
57	F Di Marco (ITA)	14
72	N Del Contrasto (ITA)	15

Table of 64
1	Nam Yh (KOR)	14
65	S Ghivoly (ISR)	15
33	C Bester (RSA)	12
32	M Krasniuk (UKR)	15
16T	J Kardaszewicz (POL)	15
81T	P Stroop (NED)	8
49	Ng TH (HKG)	14
16T	J Fuhrimann (SUI)	15
9	K Jean-Joseph (FRA)	15
73	N Wingerter (FRA)	13
41	J Fagerstedt (SWE)	11
24	D Shvelidze (AIN)	15
25	P Fortin (FRA)	15
40	F Khaperskiy (ISR)	10
72	N Del Contrasto (ITA)	15
8	I Bäckström (SWE)	6

Table of 32
65	S Ghivoly (ISR)	9
32	M Krasniuk (UKR)	15
16T	J Kardaszewicz (POL)	6
16T	J Fuhrimann (SUI)	15
9	K Jean-Joseph (FRA)	14
24	D Shvelidze (AIN)	15
25	P Fortin (FRA)	9
72	N Del Contrasto (ITA)	13

Table of 16
32	M Krasniuk (UKR)	15
16T	J Fuhrimann (SUI)	14
24	D Shvelidze (AIN)	15
72	N Del Contrasto (ITA)	9

Quarterfinals
32	M Krasniuk (UKR)	14
24	D Shvelidze (AIN)	15

=== Section 2 ===
Table of 128
69	J Martin (ESP)	13
60	K Pavlov (KAZ)	15
84T	A Hazazi (KSA)	15
44	D Erbetta (SUI)	4
53	M Kuhta (FIN)	15
75T	Lin Wc (TPE)	5
77	J Ruppenthal (GER)	9
52	L Sauri (MEX)	15
45	T Geitung (NOR)	15
84T	M Ehringhaus (GER)	14
61	L Taiwo (GBR)	8
68	N Nakamoto (JPN)	15

Table of 64
5	F Cuomo (ITA)	14
60	K Pavlov (KAZ)	15
37T	P Urban (POL)	10
28	R Brislawn (USA)	9
21	K Gurov (AIN)	13
84T	A Hazazi (KSA)	9
53	M Kuhta (FIN)	7
12	R Matsumoto (JPN)	15
13	A Fedotov (KAZ)	15
52	L Sauri (MEX)	6
45	T Geitung (NOR)	12
20	Heo Is (KOR)	15
29	M Salzer (CZE)	11
36	M Trebis (GER)	15
68	N Nakamoto (JPN)	15
4	T Grubar (SLO)	12

Table of 32
60	K Pavlov (KAZ)	7
37T	P Urban (POL)	15
21	K Gurov (AIN)	15
12	R Matsumoto (JPN)	14
13	A Fedotov (KAZ)	10
20	Heo Is (KOR)	15
36	M Trebis (GER)	10
68	N Nakamoto (JPN)	15

Table of 16
37T	P Urban (POL)	9
21	K Gurov (AIN)	15
20	Heo Is (KOR)	14
68	N Nakamoto (JPN)	13

Quarterfinals
21	K Gurov (AIN)	15
20	Heo Is (KOR)	14

=== Section 3 ===
Table of 128
67	Hsu H (TPE)	9
62	O Al-Akkas (KSA)	15
83	M Ulaankhuu (MGL)	5
46	M Osman-Touson (HUN)	15
51	M Belozerov (AIN)	15
78	H Abed (KSA)	11
75T	G Dale (AUS)	8
54	Jung Sh (KOR)	15
59	R Van Manen (RSA)	14
70	J Socha (POL)	15

Table of 64
3	A Opanasenko (UKR)	15
62	O Al-Akkas (KSA)	10
35	D Rodríguez (ESP)	11
30	S Somody (HUN)	15
19	M Straub (GER)	12
46	M Osman-Touson (HUN)	15
51	M Belozerov (AIN)	8
14	S Mencarelli (ITA)	15
11	V Altunin (EST)	14
54	Jung Sh (KOR)	15
43	B Sheum (SGP)	8
22	K Tafenau (EST)	15
27	J Jeal (GBR)	12
37T	K Schembri (ISV)	11
70	J Socha (POL)	8
6	G Kovács (HUN)	15

Table of 32
3	A Opanasenko (UKR)	6
30	S Somody (HUN)	15
46	M Osman-Touson (HUN)	9
14	S Mencarelli (ITA)	10
54	Jung Sh (KOR)	15
43	K Tafenau (EST)	8
27	J Jeal (GBR)	9
6	G Kovács (HUN)	15

Table of 16
30	S Somody (HUN)	15
14	S Mencarelli (ITA)	13
54	Jung Sh (KOR)	12
6	G Kovács (HUN)	15

Quarterfinals
30	S Somody (HUN)	15
6	G Kovács (HUN)	12

=== Section 4 ===
Table of 128
71	Kim Jb (KOR)	15
58	C De Bock (BEL)	9
55T	P Trofymenko (UKR)	14
74	J Pieper (NED)	13
79	Wu Hc (TPE)	12
50	B Joshi (IND)	15
47	Yuen NM (HKG)	15
81T	W Wałach (POL)	11
63	L Kaminer (ISR)	15
66	K Myagmar (MGL)	14

Table of 64
7	H Sakato (JPN)	14
71	Kim Jb (KOR)	13
39	I Bobrov (EST)	9
26	N Zhulinskiy (KAZ)	15
23	Á Fernández (ESP)	15
42	T Berry (GBR)	14
55T	P Trofymenko (UKR)	10
10	S Asami (JPN)	15
15	D Calderón Bartolomé (USA)	15
50	B Joshi (IND)	5
47	Yuen NM (HKG)	6
18	S Vineis (SUI)	15
31	L Dieck (USA)	12
34	K Veenenbos (NED)	15
63	L Kaminer (ISR)	12
2	I Tavor (ISR)	15

Table of 32
7	H Sakato (JPN)	15
26	N Zhulinskiy (KAZ)	10
23	Á Fernández (ESP)	11
10	S Asami (JPN)	15
15	D Calderón Bartolomé (USA)	11
18	S Vineis (SUI)	15
34	K Veenenbos (NED)	10
2	I Tavor (ISR)	15

Table of 16
7	H Sakato (JPN)	15
10	S Asami (JPN)	14
18	S Vineis (SUI)	15
2	I Tavor (ISR)	14

Quarterfinals
7	H Sakato (JPN)	10
18	S Vineis (SUI)	15

=== Finals ===
Quarterfinals
32	M Krasniuk (UKR)	14
24	D Shvelidze (AIN)	15
21	K Gurov (AIN)	15
20	I Heo (KOR)	14
30	S Somody (HUN)	15
6	G Kovács (HUN)	12
7	H Sakato (JPN)	10
18	S Vineis (SUI)	15

Semifinals
24	D Shvelidze (AIN)	15
21	K Gurov (AIN)	8
30	S Somody (HUN)	15
18	S Vineis (SUI)	13

Final
24	D Shvelidze (AIN)	15
30	S Somody (HUN)	11
