= Individual Neutral Athletes at the 2025 Summer World University Games =

Individual Neutral Athletes at the 2025 World University Games
- IOC code: AIN

in Rhine-Ruhr, Germany 16–27 July 2025
- Competitors: 47 (25 men and 22 women) in 11 sports
- Flag bearer: Khanmagomed Ramazanov
- Medals: Gold 8 Silver 8 Bronze 5 Total 21

Individual Neutral Athletes competed at the 2025 Summer World University Games, which held from 16 to 27 July 2025 in Rhine-Ruhr region, Germany.

== Competitors ==
The following is the list of competitors in the Games. This list also includes 4 badminton players (2 men and 2 woman) from Kenya who are also competing as neutral athletes due to the suspension of their National Federation by the BWF.

Sport	From	Men	Women	Total
Archery	Russia	1	1	2
Badminton	Kenya	2	2	4
Diving	Russia	1	2	3
Fencing	Russia	3	3	6
Gymnastics	Belarus	0	2	2
Judo	Russia	4	3	7
Rowing	Russia	1	1	2
Swimming	Russia	7	1	8
Table tennis	Russia	2	2	4
Taekwondo	Russia	1	2	3
Tennis	Russia	3	3	6
Total		25	22	47

== Medalists ==
Medal	Name	Sport	Event	Date
Gold	Nikolai Kolesnikov	Swimming	Men's 400 m freestyle	17 July
Gold	Alina Harnasko	Gymnastics	Women's rhythmic individual all-around	18 July
Gold	Dmitrii Shvelidze	Fencing	Men's épée	18 July
Gold	Alina Harnasko	Gymnastics	Women's rhythmic individual clubs	19 July
Gold	Aleksandr Stepanov	Swimming	Men's 1500 m freestyle	20 July
Gold	Aleksandr Stepanov	Swimming	Men's 800 m freestyle	22 July
Gold	Vladimir Sidorenko	Table tennis	Men's singles	24 July
Gold	Egor Agafonov; Ilia Simakin	Tennis	Men's doubles	25 July
Silver	Alina Harnasko	Gymnastics	Women's rhythmic individual ball	19 July
Silver	Alina Harnasko	Gymnastics	Women's rhythmic individual ribbon	19 July
Silver	Nikolai Kolesnikov	Swimming	Men's 200 m freestyle	19 July
Silver	Roman Akimov^{[a]} Nikolai Kolesnikov; Aleksandr Shchegolev; Aleksandr Stepanov; Dmitrii Zhavoronkov	Swimming	Men's 4 × 200 m freestyle relay	22 July
Silver	Abrek Naguchev	Judo	Men's 66 kg	23 July
Silver	Maksim Grebnev	Table tennis	Men's singles	24 July
Silver	Armen Agaian	Judo	Men's 73 kg	24 July
Silver	Alevtina Ibragimova	Tennis	Women's singles	26 July
Bronze	Kirill Gurov	Fencing	Men's épée	18 July
Bronze	Anastasiia Salos	Gymnastics	Women's rhythmic individual clubs	19 July
Bronze	Aleksandr Shchegolev	Swimming	Men's 100 m freestyle	21 July
Bronze	Alevtina Ibragimova; Kseniia Zaitseva	Tennis	Women's doubles	23 July
Bronze	Valeriy Endovitskiy	Judo	Men's +100 kg	25 July

Medals by sport
Sport	1st place, gold medalist(s)	2nd place, silver medalist(s)	3rd place, bronze medalist(s)	Total
Swimming	3	2	1	6
Gymnastics	2	2	1	5
Tennis	1	1	1	3
Table tennis	1	1	0	2
Fencing	1	0	1	2
Judo	0	2	1	3
Total	8	8	5	21

Medals by date
Day	Date	1st place, gold medalist(s)	2nd place, silver medalist(s)	3rd place, bronze medalist(s)	Total
Day 1	17 July	1	0	0	1
Day 2	18 July	2	0	1	3
Day 3	19 July	1	3	1	5
Day 4	20 July	1	0	0	1
Day 5	21 July	0	0	1	1
Day 6	22 July	1	1	0	2
Day 7	23 July	0	1	1	2
Day 8	24 July	1	2	0	3
Day 9	25 July	1	0	1	2
Day 10	26 July	0	1	0	1
Day 11	27 July	0	0	0	0
Total		8	8	5	21

== Archery ==
Compound

Athlete	From	Event	Ranking round		Round of 96	Round of 48	Round of 32	Round of 16	Quarterfinals	Semifinals	Final / BM	
Athlete	From	Event	Score	Seed	Opposition Score	Opposition Score	Opposition Score	Opposition Score	Opposition Score	Opposition Score	Opposition Score	Rank
Ivan Zhulin	Russia	Men's individual	705	3	Bye		Booth (USA); W 144–142	Clark (GBR); L 142–146	Did not advance			
Arina Cherkezova	Russia	Women's individual	693	4	—N/a	Bye	De Sousa (POR); W 144^{9+}–144^{9}	Sullenberger (USA); L 142–144	Did not advance			

== Badminton ==
Men

Athlete	From	Event	Round of 128	Round of 64	Round of 32	Round of 16	Quarterfinals	Semifinals	Final	
Athlete	From	Event	Opposition Score	Opposition Score	Opposition Score	Opposition Score	Opposition Score	Opposition Score	Opposition Score	Rank
Farnandas Onchiri	Kenya	Singles	Bye	Teeraratsakul (THA); L 4–15, 8–15	Did not advance					
Brian Ongeche	Kenya	Singles	Bye	Rikreay (NEP); L 3–15, 6–15	Did not advance					

Women

Athlete	From	Event	Round of 128	Round of 64	Round of 32	Round of 16	Quarterfinals	Semifinals	Final	
Athlete	From	Event	Opposition Score	Opposition Score	Opposition Score	Opposition Score	Opposition Score	Opposition Score	Opposition Score	Rank
Patience Onyango	Kenya	Singles	Ng (HKG); L 3–15, 3–15	Did not advance						
Naomi Wandili	Kenya	Singles	Bye	Cloteaux-Foucault (FRA); L 5–15, 8–15	Did not advance					

Mixed

Athlete	From	Event	Round of 64	Round of 32	Round of 16	Quarterfinals	Semifinals	Final	
Athlete	From	Event	Opposition Score	Opposition Score	Opposition Score	Opposition Score	Opposition Score	Opposition Score	Rank
Farnandas Onchiri; Patience Onyango	Kenya	Doubles	Punchihewa / Vidanage (SRI); L 6–15, 4–15	Did not advance					
Brian Ongeche; Naomi Wandili	Kenya	Doubles	Lee / Ngo (USA); L 5–15, 6–15	Did not advance					

== Diving ==
Men

Athlete	From	Event	Preliminaries		Final	
Athlete	From	Event	Points	Rank	Points	Rank
Grigory Ivanov	Russia	1 m springboard	323.30	8 Q	343.15	4
Grigory Ivanov	Russia	3 m springboard	378.35	9 Q	357.00	11

Women

Athlete	From	Event	Preliminaries		Final	
Athlete	From	Event	Points	Rank	Points	Rank
Uliana Manaekova	Russia	3 m springboard	126.20	25	Did not advance	
Uliana Manaekova	Russia	10 m platform	241.60	12 Q	204.45	11
Erika Sazonova	Russia	1 m springboard	217.65	14 Q	237.60	7
Erika Sazonova	Russia	3 m springboard	207.80	17	Did not advance	
Uliana Manaekova; Erika Sazonova	Russia	3 m synchro springboard	—N/a		224.31	6

Mixed

Athlete	From	Event	Final	
Athlete	From	Event	Points	Rank
Grigory Ivanov; Erika Sazonova	Russia	3 m synchro springboard	265.23	4

== Fencing ==
Men

Athlete	From	Event	Group stage		Round of 128	Round of 64	Round of 32	Round of 16	Quarterfinal	Semifinal / Pl	Final / BM / Pl	
Athlete	From	Event	Result	Rank	Opposition Score	Opposition Score	Opposition Score	Opposition Score	Opposition Score	Opposition Score	Opposition Score	Rank
Mikhail Belozerov	Russia	Épée	3–3	4 Q	Abed (KSA); W 15–11	Mencarelli (ITA); L 8–15	Did not advance					
Kirill Gurov	Russia	Épée	4–1	1 Q	Bye	Hazazi (KSA); W 13–9	Matsumoto (JPN); W 15–14	Urban (POL); W 15–9	Heo (KOR); W 15–14	Shvelidze (AIN); L 8–15	Did not advance	3rd place, bronze medalist(s)
Dmitrii Shvelidze	Russia	Épée	4–2	3 Q	Bye	Fahlstedt (SWE); W 15–11	Jean-Joseph (FRA); W 15–14	Del Contrasto (ITA); W 15–9	Krasniuk (UKR); W 15–14	Gurov (AIN); W 15–8	Somody (HUN); W 15–11	1st place, gold medalist(s)
Mikhail Belozerov; Kirill Gurov; Dmitrii Shvelidze	Russia	Team épée	—N/a				Bye	Spain; W 45–38	Italy; L 37–45	Ukraine; W 45–23	Switzerland; W 45–27	5

Women

Athlete	From	Event	Group stage		Round of 128	Round of 64	Round of 32	Round of 16	Quarterfinal	Semifinal / Pl	Final / BM / Pl	
Athlete	From	Event	Result	Rank	Opposition Score	Opposition Score	Opposition Score	Opposition Score	Opposition Score	Opposition Score	Opposition Score	Rank
Polina Khaertdinova	Russia	Épée	4–1	1 Q	Bye	Rahimova (AZE); W 15–13	Saito (JPN); L 14–15	Did not advance				
Galina Krymova	Russia	Épée	1–5	5	Did not advance							
Taisiia Larkina	Russia	Épée	6–0	1 Q	Bye	Tercjak (POL); W 15–11	Bultynck (BEL); W 14–13	Saito (JPN); W 15–4	Hsieh (HKG); L 11–12	Did not advance		
Polina Khaertdinova; Galina Krymova; Taisiia Larkina	Russia	Team épée	—N/a				Bye	Switzerland; L 36–45	Did not advance			

== Gymnastics ==
=== Rhythmic gymnastics ===
Individual

Athlete	From	Event	Final & Qualification					
Athlete	From	Event	Hoop	Ball	Clubs	Ribbon	Total	Rank
Alina Harnasko	Belarus	All-around	28.500 Q	28.900 Q	29.050 Q	28.400 Q	114.850	1st place, gold medalist(s)
Alina Harnasko	Belarus	Hoop	27.000	—N/a			27.000	5
Alina Harnasko	Belarus	Ball	—N/a	28.150	—N/a		28.150	2nd place, silver medalist(s)
Alina Harnasko	Belarus	Clubs	—N/a		29.550	—N/a	29.550	1st place, gold medalist(s)
Alina Harnasko	Belarus	Ribbon	—N/a			27.850	27.850	2nd place, silver medalist(s)
Anastasiia Salos	Belarus	All-around	26.600	25.700	27.800 Q	25.650 Q	105.750	6
Anastasiia Salos	Belarus	Clubs	—N/a		27.850	—N/a	27.850	3rd place, bronze medalist(s)
Anastasiia Salos	Belarus	Ribbon	—N/a			25.950	25.950	5

== Judo ==
Men

Athlete	From	Event	Round of 64	Round of 32	Round of 16	Quarterfinals	Semifinals	Repechage	Final / BM	
Athlete	From	Event	Opposition Score	Opposition Score	Opposition Score	Opposition Score	Opposition Score	Opposition Score	Opposition Score	Rank
Abrek Naguchev	Russia	−66 kg	Bye	Manomai (THA); W 100–000	Ickes (GER); W 001–000	Gusmão (BRA); W 001–000	Serikbayev (KAZ); W 100–011	Bye	Kentoku (JPN); L 000–110	2nd place, silver medalist(s)
Armen Agaian	Russia	−73 kg	—N/a	Chang (TPE); W 100–000	An (KOR); W 010–000	De Oliveira (BRA); W 011–001	Ahibo (FRA); W 020–000	Bye	Osmanov (MDA); L 001–004	2nd place, silver medalist(s)
Mukhamed-Ali Mataev	Russia	−100 kg	—N/a	Bye	Kappelmeier (GER); L WO	Did not advance				
Valeriy Endovitskiy	Russia	+100 kg	—N/a	Bye	Korevaar (NED); W 100–000	Belz (GER); W 100–000	Nakamura (JPN); L 000–010	Bye	Ravshankulov (UZB); W 010–001	3rd place, bronze medalist(s)

Women

Athlete	From	Event	Round of 32	Round of 16	Quarterfinals	Semifinals	Repechage	Final / BM	
Athlete	From	Event	Opposition Score	Opposition Score	Opposition Score	Opposition Score	Opposition Score	Opposition Score	Rank
Iuliia Semikolenova	Russia	−48 kg	Bye	Chiu (TPE); L WO	Did not advance				
Polina Iudina	Russia	−78 kg	Kolar (SLO); W 100–000	Freitas (BRA); L 000–100	Did not advance				
Alfiia Dashkina	Russia	+78 kg	Barra (CHI); W 110–000	Somkhishvili (GEO); L 000–100	Did not advance				

== Rowing ==
Athlete	From	Event	Heats		Quarterfinals		Semifinals		Final	Rank
Athlete	From	Event	Time	Rank	Time	Rank	Time	Rank	Time	Rank
Maksim Zhevlachenko	Russia	Men's single sculls	7:14.26	2 Q	7:23.83	2 Q	7:10.29	5 FB	7:05.06	7
Veronika Shliaptseva	Russia	Women's single sculls	8:21.44	1 Q	8:49.98	2 Q	8:04.25	4 FB	8:29.03	7

== Swimming ==
Men

Athlete	From	Event	Heat		Semifinal		Final	
Athlete	From	Event	Time	Rank	Time	Rank	Time	Rank
Roman Akimov	Russia	200 m freestyle	1:49.86	19	Did not advance			
Roman Akimov	Russia	400 m freestyle	3:59.07	21	—N/a		Did not advance	
Nikolai Kolesnikov	Russia	200 m freestyle	1:47.23	1 Q	1:46.72	3 Q	1:46.77	2nd place, silver medalist(s)
Nikolai Kolesnikov	Russia	400 m freestyle	3:48.75	1 Q	—N/a		3:46.66	1st place, gold medalist(s)
Aleksandr Shchegolev	Russia	50 m freestyle	22.68	14 Q	22.29	9	Did not advance	
Aleksandr Shchegolev	Russia	100 m freestyle	48.57	2 Q	48.67	5 Q	48.34	3rd place, bronze medalist(s)
Aleksandr Shchegolev	Russia	50 m butterfly	23.70	6 Q	23.72	9	Did not advance	
Aleksandr Stepanov	Russia	800 m freestyle	8:00.75	2 Q	—N/a		7:46.51	1st place, gold medalist(s)
Aleksandr Stepanov	Russia	1500 m freestyle	15:23.20	7 Q	—N/a		14:55.98	1st place, gold medalist(s)
Aleksei Sudarev	Russia	200 m breaststroke	2:16.04	17	Did not advance			
Aleksei Sudarev	Russia	200 m individual medley	2:00.95	8 Q	2:00.96	10	Did not advance	
Aleksei Sudarev	Russia	400 m individual medley	4:34.12	20	—N/a		Did not advance	
Aleksei Tkachev	Russia	50 m backstroke	25.67	14 Q	25.46	12	Did not advance	
Aleksei Tkachev	Russia	100 m backstroke	54.56	7 Q	54.34	6 Q	54.42	6
Aleksei Tkachev	Russia	200 m backstroke	1:58.90	2 Q	1:58.00	3 Q	1:58.45	4
Dmitrii Zhavoronkov	Russia	50 m freestyle	22.82	20	Did not advance			
Dmitrii Zhavoronkov	Russia	100 m freestyle	49.43	10 Q	48.59	4 Q	49.28	8
Roman Akimov; Nikolai Kolesnikov; Aleksandr Shchegolev; Dmitrii Zhavoronkov	Russia	4 × 100 m freestyle relay	3:21.13	11	—N/a		Did not advance	
Roman Akimov^{[a]} Nikolai Kolesnikov; Aleksandr Shchegolev; Aleksandr Stepanov; Dmitrii Zhavoronkov	Russia	4 × 200 m freestyle relay	7:16.71	2 Q	—N/a		7:08.33	2nd place, silver medalist(s)
Aleksandr Shchegolev; Aleksei Sudarev; Aleksei Tkachev; Dmitrii Zhavoronkov	Russia	4 × 100 m medley relay	3:37.57	3 Q	—N/a		3:36.18	4

Women

Athlete	From	Event	Heat		Semifinal		Final	
Athlete	From	Event	Time	Rank	Time	Rank	Time	Rank
Iana Shakirova	Russia	100 m freestyle	55.76	10 Q	55.06	8 Q	54.92	8
Iana Shakirova	Russia	50 m breaststroke	31.66	12 Q	31.23	6 Q	31.38	7
Iana Shakirova	Russia	200 m individual medley	2:17.04	14 Q	2:14.46	6 Q	2:14.13	5

^{a} Swimmers who participated in the heats only.

== Table tennis ==
Men

Athlete	From	Event	Group stage			Round of 128	Round of 64	Round of 32	Round of 16	Quarterfinals	Semifinals	Final	
Athlete	From	Event	Opposition Result	Opposition Result	Rank	Opposition Result	Opposition Result	Opposition Result	Opposition Result	Opposition Result	Opposition Result	Opposition Result	Rank
Maksim Grebnev	Russia	Singles	Chen (AUS); W 3–0	Molina (ECU); W 3–0	1 Q	Al-Mutairi (KSA); W 4–0	Chua (SGP); W 4–2	Zeng (CHN); W 4–3	Picard (FRA); W 4–2	Fadeev (GER); W 4–3	Sun (CHN); W 4–2	Sidorenko (AIN); L 1–4	2nd place, silver medalist(s)
Vladimir Sidorenko	Russia	Singles	Yılmaz (TUR); W 3–0	Degros (BEL); W 3–0	1 Q	Bye	Sheth (USA); W 4–0	Movileanu (ROU); W 4–2	Cho (KOR); W 4–3	Kao (TPE); W 4–2	Ionescu (ROU); W 4–0	Grebnev (AIN); W 4–1	1st place, gold medalist(s)
Maksim Grebnev; Vladimir Sidorenko	Russia	Doubles	—N/a				Dahal / Joshi (NEP); W 3–0	Chang / Feng (TPE); L 2–3	Did not advance				

Women

Athlete	From	Event	Group stage			Round of 128	Round of 64	Round of 32	Round of 16	Quarterfinals	Semifinals	Final	
Athlete	From	Event	Opposition Result	Opposition Result	Rank	Opposition Result	Opposition Result	Opposition Result	Opposition Result	Opposition Result	Opposition Result	Opposition Result	Rank
Elizabet Abraamian	Russia	Singles	Castro (CRC); W 3–0	Liu (CAN); W 3–0	1 Q	Abilzade (AZE); W 4–0	Haraç (TUR); W 4–0	Lee (HKG); W 4–2	Wang (CHN); L 0–4	Did not advance			
Mariia Tailakova	Russia	Singles	Liao (CAN); W 3–0	Mikayilova (AZE); W 3–0	1 Q	Bye	Brzyska (POL); L 1–4	Did not advance					
Elizabet Abraamian; Mariia Tailakova	Russia	Doubles	—N/a				Sung / Tan (USA); W 3–1	Ng / Wong (HKG); W 0–3	Did not advance				

Mixed

Athlete	From	Event	Round of 128	Round of 64	Round of 32	Round of 16	Quarterfinals	Semifinals	Final	
Athlete	From	Event	Opposition Result	Opposition Result	Opposition Result	Opposition Result	Opposition Result	Opposition Result	Opposition Result	Rank
Maksim Grebnev; Mariia Tailakova	Russia	Doubles	Bye	Guo / Liao (CAN); W 3–0	Movileanu / Zaharia (ROU); W 3–1	Moullet / Maurer (SUI); W 3–0	Chen / Wang (CHN); L 1–4	Did not advance		
Vladimir Sidorenko; Elizabet Abraamian	Russia	Doubles	Bye	Ionescu / Sîngeorzan (ROU); W 3–0	Zelinka / Labošová (SVK); W 3–0	Picard / Cok (FRA); W 3–0	Chan / Wong (HKG); L 3–4	Did not advance		

== Taekwondo ==
Men

Athlete	From	Event	Round of 32	Round of 16	Quarterfinals	Semifinals	Final	
Athlete	From	Event	Opposition Result	Opposition Result	Opposition Result	Opposition Result	Opposition Result	Rank
Khanmagomed Ramazanov	Russia	Men's −74 kg	Bouriel (CAN); L 0–2	Did not advance				
Ariadna Yandolovskaya	Russia	Women's −57 kg	Lin (TPE); L 0–2	Did not advance				
Polina Shvedkova	Russia	Women's +73 kg	Bye	Akbulak (TUR); W 2–0	Chin (TPE); L 0–2	Did not advance		

== Tennis ==
Men

Athlete	From	Event	Round of 128	Round of 64	Round of 32	Round of 16	Quarterfinals	Semifinals	Final	
Athlete	From	Event	Opposition Score	Opposition Score	Opposition Score	Opposition Score	Opposition Score	Opposition Score	Opposition Score	Rank
Egor Agafonov	Russia	Singles	Bye	Roothman (RSA); W 7–6^{(7–1)}, 6–2	Charoenphon (THA); W 7–5, 6–0	Friend (JPN); L 1–6, 4–6	Did not advance			
Ilia Simakin	Russia	Singles	Bye	Jucha (FRA); W 6–3, 7–6^{(7–4)}	Chen (TPE); W 6–3, 6–2	Shin (UZB); W 6–3, 6–2	Samuel (GBR); L 6–2, 5–7, 3–6	Did not advance		
Egor Agafonov; Ilia Simakin	Russia	Doubles	—N/a		Bye	Milushev / Shin (UZB); W 6–3, 7–6^{(7–4)}	Dietrich / Stäheli (SUI); W 2–6, 7–6^{(7–4)}, [10–5]	Gabelic / Slavic (SWE); W 6–2, 6–3	Alkaya / Duran (TUR); W 3–6, 6–2, [10–3]	1st place, gold medalist(s)

Women

Athlete	From	Event	Round of 64	Round of 32	Round of 16	Quarterfinals	Semifinals	Final	
Athlete	From	Event	Opposition Score	Opposition Score	Opposition Score	Opposition Score	Opposition Score	Opposition Score	Rank
Polina Iatcenko	Russia	Singles	Athieno (UGA); W 6–0, 6–0	Maloney (GBR); L 6–7, 3–6	Did not advance				
Alevtina Ibragimova	Russia	Singles	Bye	Center (USA); W 6–3, 7–5	Yoshimoto (JPN); W 6–3, 2–6, 6–4	Li (CHN); W 3–6, 6–4, 6–4	Otzipka (BEL); W 6–4, 6–4	Méri (SVK); L 3–6, 6–1, 5–7	2nd place, silver medalist(s)
Alevtina Ibragimova; Kseniia Zaitseva	Russia	Doubles	—N/a	Bye	Ferrara / Lombardini (ITA); W 6–3, 6–2	Nguyen Tan / Robbe (FRA); W 6–4, 6–1	Li / Lin (TPE); L 2–6, 3–6	Did not advance	3rd place, bronze medalist(s)

Mixed

Athlete	From	Event	Round of 32	Round of 16	Quarterfinals	Semifinals	Final	
Athlete	From	Event	Opposition Score	Opposition Score	Opposition Score	Opposition Score	Opposition Score	Rank
Kseniia Zaitseva; Pavel Verbin	Russia	Doubles	Iona / Mukwaturi (ZIM); W 6–1, 6–1	Aulia / Jin (AUS); L 5–7, 5–7	Did not advance			
