= Table tennis at the 2025 Summer Universiade – Women's singles =

Women's singles at the 2025 Summer World University Games
- Venue: Messe Essen
- Location: Essen
- Dates: 19―21 July (group stage); 21―24 July (finals)
- Competitors: 115 from 41 nations

Medalists
| gold medal | Zhao Shang | China |
| silver medal | Huang Yu-jie | Chinese Taipei |
| bronze medal | Ng Wing Lam | Hong Kong |
| bronze medal | Wang Xiaotong | China |

The women's singles at the 2025 Summer World University Games in Rhine-Ruhr, Germany was held from 19 to 24 July 2025. Zhao Shang from China won the gold medal. Huang Yu-jie from Chinese Taipei earned the silver medal. The two bronze medals were awarded to Ng Wing Lam from Hong Kong and Wang Xiaotong from China.

== Schedule ==
All times are Central European Time (UTC+1)

| Date | Round |
|---|---|
| 19 July | Group Stage |
| 20 July | Group Stage |
| 21 July | Group Stage |
| 21 July | Preliminary Round |
| 22 July | Round of 64 |
| 22 July | Round of 32 |
| 23 July | Round of 16 |
| 23 July | Quarterfinals |
| 24 July | Semifinals |
| 24 July | Final |

== Groups stage ==
Competitors were divided into initial round-robin qualification groups. Players faced everyone in their assigned group, with top performers advancing to the main tournament bracket.

| Qualified for Round of 64 |
| Qualified for Round of 128 |

=== Group 1 ===
| Rank | Athlete | W | L | GW | GL | PW | PL | HKG | KOR | PHI |
|---|---|---|---|---|---|---|---|---|---|---|
| 1 | Wong Hoi Tung (HKG) | 2 | 0 | 6 | 0 | 68 | 39 | X | 3–0 | 3–0 |
| 2 | Im Jin-ah (KOR) | 1 | 1 | 3 | 3 | 55 | 53 | 0–3 | X | 3–0 |
| 3 | Kristine Alicaya (PHI) | 0 | 2 | 0 | 6 | 35 | 66 | 0–3 | 0–3 | X |

=== Group 2 ===
| Rank | Athlete | W | L | GW | GL | PW | PL | KOR | IND | LBN |
|---|---|---|---|---|---|---|---|---|---|---|
| 1 | Lee Da-eun (KOR) | 2 | 0 | 6 | 0 | 66 | 31 | X | 3–0 | 3–0 |
| 2 | Taneesha Kotecha (IND) | 1 | 1 | 3 | 3 | 46 | 54 | 0–3 | X | 3–0 |
| 3 | Mariam El-Habech (LBN) | 0 | 2 | 0 | 6 | 39 | 66 | 0–3 | 0–3 | X |

=== Group 3 ===
| Rank | Athlete | W | L | GW | GL | PW | PL | TPE | SRI | AUS |
|---|---|---|---|---|---|---|---|---|---|---|
| 1 | Tsai Yun-en (TPE) | 2 | 0 | 6 | 0 | 66 | 27 | X | 3–0 | 3–0 |
| 2 | Thanushi Rodrigo (SRI) | 1 | 1 | 3 | 5 | 52 | 79 | 0–3 | X | 3–2 |
| 3 | Chermaine Quah (AUS) | 0 | 2 | 2 | 6 | 66 | 78 | 0–3 | 2–3 | X |

=== Group 4 ===
| Rank | Athlete | W | L | GW | GL | PW | PL | IND | USA | AZE |
|---|---|---|---|---|---|---|---|---|---|---|
| 1 | Suhana Saini (IND) | 2 | 0 | 6 | 0 | 66 | 35 | X | 3–0 | 3–0 |
| 2 | Angie Tan (USA) | 1 | 1 | 3 | 3 | 52 | 47 | 0–3 | X | 3–0 |
| 3 | Nigar Mahmudova (AZE) | 0 | 2 | 0 | 6 | 30 | 66 | 0–3 | 0–3 | X |

=== Group 5 ===
| Rank | Athlete | W | L | GW | GL | PW | PL | NED | SRI | AZE |
|---|---|---|---|---|---|---|---|---|---|---|
| 1 | Shuohan Men (NED) | 2 | 0 | 6 | 0 | 33 | 18 | X | W/O | 3–0 |
| 2 | Nathasha Siwrathne (SRI) | 1 | 1 | 3 | 3 | 37 | 23 | W/O | X | 3–0 |
| 3 | Sabina Mammadova (AZE) | 0 | 2 | 0 | 6 | 41 | 70 | 0–3 | 0–3 | X |

=== Group 6 ===
| Rank | Athlete | W | L | GW | GL | PW | PL | FRA | GER | NEP |
|---|---|---|---|---|---|---|---|---|---|---|
| 1 | Claire Picard (FRA) | 2 | 0 | 6 | 0 | 68 | 29 | X | 3–0 | 3–0 |
| 2 | Sophia Klee (GER) | 1 | 1 | 3 | 3 | 56 | 53 | 0–3 | X | 3–0 |
| 3 | Sikka Suwal (NEP) | 0 | 2 | 0 | 6 | 26 | 68 | 0–3 | 0–3 | X |

=== Group 7 ===
| Rank | Athlete | W | L | GW | GL | PW | PL | THA | CHI | LBN |
|---|---|---|---|---|---|---|---|---|---|---|
| 1 | Jinnipha Sawettabut (THA) | 2 | 0 | 6 | 0 | 66 | 21 | X | 3–0 | 3–0 |
| 2 | Claudia Infante (CHI) | 1 | 1 | 3 | 5 | 51 | 74 | 0–3 | X | 3–2 |
| 3 | Talia Azar (LBN) | 0 | 2 | 2 | 6 | 53 | 75 | 0–3 | 2–3 | X |

=== Group 8 ===
| Rank | Athlete | W | L | GW | GL | PW | PL | POL | HUN | PHI |
|---|---|---|---|---|---|---|---|---|---|---|
| 1 | Anna Brzyska (POL) | 2 | 0 | 6 | 0 | 66 | 33 | X | 3–0 | 3–0 |
| 2 | Helga Dari (HUN) | 1 | 1 | 3 | 3 | 49 | 42 | 0–3 | X | 3–0 |
| 3 | Allana Salar (PHI) | 0 | 2 | 0 | 6 | 26 | 66 | 0–3 | 0–3 | X |

=== Group 9 ===
| Rank | Athlete | W | L | GW | GL | PW | PL | ROU | CRO | SGP |
|---|---|---|---|---|---|---|---|---|---|---|
| 1 | Evelyn Ungvári (ROU) | 2 | 0 | 6 | 1 | 77 | 55 | X | 3–1 | 3–0 |
| 2 | Andrea Pavlović (CRO) | 1 | 1 | 4 | 3 | 70 | 62 | 1–3 | X | 3–0 |
| 3 | Chan Lu Wen (SGP) | 0 | 2 | 0 | 6 | 36 | 66 | 0–3 | 0–3 | X |

=== Group 10 ===
| Rank | Athlete | W | L | GW | GL | PW | PL | JPN | USA | CHI |
|---|---|---|---|---|---|---|---|---|---|---|
| 1 | Sakura Aoi (JPN) | 2 | 0 | 6 | 0 | 66 | 21 | X | 3–0 | 3–0 |
| 2 | Joanna Sung (USA) | 1 | 1 | 3 | 3 | 44 | 50 | 0–3 | X | 3–0 |
| 3 | Darling Fuentes (CHI) | 0 | 2 | 0 | 6 | 27 | 66 | 0–3 | 0–3 | X |

=== Group 11 ===
| Rank | Athlete | W | L | GW | GL | PW | PL | HKG | GER | ECU |
|---|---|---|---|---|---|---|---|---|---|---|
| 1 | Kong Tsz Lam (HKG) | 2 | 0 | 6 | 1 | 75 | 37 | X | 3–1 | 3–0 |
| 2 | Yuki Tsutsui (GER) | 1 | 1 | 4 | 4 | 74 | 74 | 1–3 | X | 3–1 |
| 3 | Damaris Sanmartin (ECU) | 0 | 2 | 1 | 6 | 42 | 80 | 0–3 | 1–3 | X |

=== Group 12 ===
| Rank | Athlete | W | L | GW | GL | PW | PL | HKG | ROU | ECU |
|---|---|---|---|---|---|---|---|---|---|---|
| 1 | Lee Hoi Man (HKG) | 2 | 0 | 6 | 0 | 66 | 14 | X | 3–0 | 3–0 |
| 2 | Andrea Teglas (ROU) | 1 | 1 | 3 | 3 | 38 | 54 | 0–3 | X | 3–0 |
| 3 | Diana Espinales (ECU) | 0 | 2 | 0 | 6 | 30 | 66 | 0–3 | 0–3 | X |

=== Group 13 ===
| Rank | Athlete | W | L | GW | GL | PW | PL | FRA | SVK | CHI |
|---|---|---|---|---|---|---|---|---|---|---|
| 1 | Isà Cok (FRA) | 2 | 0 | 6 | 1 | 75 | 39 | X | 3–1 | 3–0 |
| 2 | Natália Grigelová (SVK) | 1 | 1 | 4 | 4 | 69 | 78 | 1–3 | X | 3–1 |
| 3 | Catalina Muñoz (CHI) | 0 | 2 | 1 | 6 | 49 | 76 | 0–3 | 1–3 | X |

=== Group 14 ===
| Rank | Athlete | W | L | GW | GL | PW | PL | CHN | IND | HUN |
|---|---|---|---|---|---|---|---|---|---|---|
| 1 | Zhao Shang (CHN) | 2 | 0 | 6 | 1 | 73 | 51 | X | 3–1 | 3–0 |
| 2 | Sayali Wani (IND) | 1 | 1 | 4 | 3 | 69 | 64 | 1–3 | X | 3–0 |
| 3 | Írisz Laskai (HUN) | 0 | 2 | 0 | 6 | 42 | 69 | 0–3 | 0–3 | X |

=== Group 15 ===
| Rank | Athlete | W | L | GW | GL | PW | PL | NGR | TUR | MAC |
|---|---|---|---|---|---|---|---|---|---|---|
| 1 | Hope Udoaka (NGR) | 2 | 0 | 6 | 0 | 66 | 28 | X | 3–0 | 3–0 |
| 2 | Ezel Arslan (TUR) | 1 | 1 | 3 | 3 | 50 | 46 | 0–3 | X | 3–0 |
| 3 | Cheung Pui Man (MAC) | 0 | 2 | 0 | 6 | 24 | 66 | 0–3 | 0–3 | X |

=== Group 16 ===
| Rank | Athlete | W | L | GW | GL | PW | PL | IND | USA | COL |
|---|---|---|---|---|---|---|---|---|---|---|
| 1 | Pritha Vartikar (IND) | 2 | 0 | 6 | 3 | 90 | 79 | X | 3–2 | 3–1 |
| 2 | Emily Tan (USA) | 1 | 1 | 5 | 4 | 86 | 73 | 2–3 | X | 3–1 |
| 3 | Alejandra Álzate (COL) | 0 | 2 | 2 | 6 | 66 | 90 | 1–3 | 1–3 | X |

=== Group 17 ===
| Rank | Athlete | W | L | GW | GL | PW | PL | SGP | AZE | UGA |
|---|---|---|---|---|---|---|---|---|---|---|
| 1 | Tan Zhao Yun (SGP) | 2 | 0 | 6 | 0 | 66 | 18 | X | 3–0 | 3–0 |
| 2 | Khadija Abilzade (AZE) | 1 | 1 | 3 | 5 | 58 | 68 | 0–3 | X | 3–2 |
| 3 | Teddy Wotanabeera (UGA) | 0 | 2 | 2 | 6 | 41 | 79 | 0–3 | 2–3 | X |

=== Group 18 ===
| Rank | Athlete | W | L | GW | GL | PW | PL | AIN | CAN | AZE |
|---|---|---|---|---|---|---|---|---|---|---|
| 1 | Mariia Tailakova (AIN) | 2 | 0 | 6 | 0 | 66 | 28 | X | 3–0 | 3–0 |
| 2 | Ivy Liao (CAN) | 1 | 1 | 3 | 3 | 48 | 51 | 0–3 | X | 3–0 |
| 3 | Zemfira Mikayilova (AZE) | 0 | 2 | 0 | 6 | 31 | 66 | 0–3 | 0–3 | X |

=== Group 19 ===
| Rank | Athlete | W | L | GW | GL | PW | PL | SGP | KOR | UZB |
|---|---|---|---|---|---|---|---|---|---|---|
| 1 | Chloe Lai (SGP) | 2 | 0 | 6 | 2 | 84 | 78 | X | 3–2 | 3–0 |
| 2 | Gwon Yeon-hui (KOR) | 1 | 1 | 5 | 4 | 87 | 79 | 2–3 | X | 3–1 |
| 3 | Mehriniso Norkulova (UZB) | 0 | 2 | 1 | 6 | 59 | 73 | 0–3 | 1–3 | X |

=== Group 20 ===
| Rank | Athlete | W | L | GW | GL | PW | PL | TUR | MGL | AUS |
|---|---|---|---|---|---|---|---|---|---|---|
| 1 | Özge Yılmaz (TUR) | 2 | 0 | 6 | 0 | 67 | 35 | X | 3–0 | 3–0 |
| 2 | Egshiglen Bat-Erdene (MGL) | 1 | 1 | 3 | 5 | 70 | 76 | 0–3 | X | 3–2 |
| 3 | Ellen Walker (AUS) | 0 | 2 | 2 | 6 | 60 | 86 | 0–3 | 2–3 | X |

=== Group 21 ===
| Rank | Athlete | W | L | GW | GL | PW | PL | HUN | QAT | AUS |
|---|---|---|---|---|---|---|---|---|---|---|
| 1 | Anna Fejős (HUN) | 2 | 0 | 6 | 0 | 66 | 38 | X | 3–0 | 3–0 |
| 2 | Maryam Ali (QAT) | 1 | 1 | 3 | 4 | 58 | 68 | 0–3 | X | 3–1 |
| 3 | Jacqueline Budiarto (AUS) | 0 | 2 | 1 | 6 | 57 | 75 | 0–3 | 1–3 | X |

=== Group 22 ===
| Rank | Athlete | W | L | GW | GL | PW | PL | UZB | MGL | ZAM |
|---|---|---|---|---|---|---|---|---|---|---|
| 1 | Markhabo Magdieva (UZB) | 2 | 0 | 6 | 0 | 66 | 30 | X | 3–0 | 3–0 |
| 2 | Namuunbaigali Erdene (MGL) | 1 | 1 | 3 | 3 | 50 | 40 | 0–3 | X | 3–0 |
| 3 | Sophie Nkhuwah (ZAM) | 0 | 2 | 0 | 6 | 20 | 66 | 0–3 | 0–3 | X |

=== Group 23 ===
| Rank | Athlete | W | L | GW | GL | PW | PL | FRA | NED | CAN |
|---|---|---|---|---|---|---|---|---|---|---|
| 1 | Agathe Avezou (FRA) | 2 | 0 | 6 | 0 | 66 | 34 | X | 3–0 | 3–0 |
| 2 | Karlijn van Lierop (NED) | 1 | 1 | 3 | 3 | 54 | 61 | 0–3 | X | 3–0 |
| 3 | Ching Nam Fu (CAN) | 0 | 2 | 0 | 6 | 43 | 68 | 0–3 | 0–3 | X |

=== Group 24 ===
| Rank | Athlete | W | L | GW | GL | PW | PL | POR | SVK | KOR |
|---|---|---|---|---|---|---|---|---|---|---|
| 1 | Patricia Santos (POR) | 2 | 0 | 6 | 4 | 92 | 91 | X | 3–2 | 3–2 |
| 2 | Ema Labošová (SVK) | 1 | 1 | 5 | 4 | 86 | 78 | 2–3 | X | 3–1 |
| 3 | Lee Eun-ju (KOR) | 0 | 2 | 3 | 6 | 74 | 83 | 2–3 | 1–3 | X |

=== Group 25 ===
| Rank | Athlete | W | L | GW | GL | PW | PL | MAC | SUI | CHI |
|---|---|---|---|---|---|---|---|---|---|---|
| 1 | Seak Hui Li (MAC) | 2 | 0 | 6 | 0 | 67 | 34 | X | 3–0 | 3–0 |
| 2 | Ludivine Maurer (SUI) | 1 | 1 | 3 | 5 | 69 | 80 | 0–3 | X | 3–2 |
| 3 | Isidora Olivares (CHI) | 0 | 2 | 2 | 6 | 57 | 79 | 0–3 | 2–3 | X |

=== Group 26 ===
| Rank | Athlete | W | L | GW | GL | PW | PL | POL | SVK | COL |
|---|---|---|---|---|---|---|---|---|---|---|
| 1 | Ilona Sztwiertnia (POL) | 2 | 0 | 6 | 1 | 76 | 43 | X | 3–0 | 3–1 |
| 2 | Adriana Illášová (SVK) | 1 | 1 | 3 | 3 | 49 | 54 | 0–3 | X | 3–0 |
| 3 | Juliana Rodríguez (COL) | 0 | 2 | 1 | 6 | 48 | 76 | 1–3 | 0–3 | X |

=== Group 27 ===
| Rank | Athlete | W | L | GW | GL | PW | PL | POR | MGL | CAN |
|---|---|---|---|---|---|---|---|---|---|---|
| 1 | Inês Matos (POR) | 2 | 0 | 6 | 0 | 66 | 37 | X | 3–0 | 3–0 |
| 2 | Bolor-Erdene Batmunkh (MGL) | 1 | 1 | 3 | 4 | 58 | 64 | 0–3 | X | 3–1 |
| 3 | Nicole Cai (CAN) | 0 | 2 | 1 | 6 | 52 | 75 | 0–3 | 1–3 | X |

=== Group 28 ===
| Rank | Athlete | W | L | GW | GL | PW | PL | NED | THA | LBN |
|---|---|---|---|---|---|---|---|---|---|---|
| 1 | Emine Ernst (NED) | 2 | 0 | 6 | 0 | 66 | 33 | X | 3–0 | 3–0 |
| 2 | Nanapat Kola (THA) | 1 | 1 | 3 | 3 | 55 | 46 | 0–3 | X | 3–0 |
| 3 | Laetitia Azar (LBN) | 0 | 2 | 0 | 6 | 24 | 66 | 0–3 | 0–3 | X |

=== Group 29 ===
| Rank | Athlete | W | L | GW | GL | PW | PL | JPN | USA | MGL |
|---|---|---|---|---|---|---|---|---|---|---|
| 1 | Mana Asada (JPN) | 2 | 0 | 6 | 0 | 67 | 42 | X | 3–0 | 3–0 |
| 2 | Anastasia Wang (USA) | 1 | 1 | 3 | 5 | 78 | 75 | 0–3 | X | 3–2 |
| 3 | Baljinnyam Uvgunburged (MGL) | 0 | 2 | 2 | 6 | 60 | 88 | 0–3 | 2–3 | X |

=== Group 30 ===
| Rank | Athlete | W | L | GW | GL | PW | PL | GER | MDA | BRA |
|---|---|---|---|---|---|---|---|---|---|---|
| 1 | Lea Lachenmayer (GER) | 2 | 0 | 6 | 2 | 79 | 59 | X | 3–1 | 3–1 |
| 2 | Alexandra Chiriacova (MDA) | 1 | 1 | 4 | 3 | 61 | 61 | 1–3 | X | 3–0 |
| 3 | Sabrina Miyabara (BRA) | 0 | 2 | 1 | 6 | 56 | 76 | 1–3 | 0–3 | X |

=== Group 31 ===
| Rank | Athlete | W | L | GW | GL | PW | PL | POL | THA | SGP |
|---|---|---|---|---|---|---|---|---|---|---|
| 1 | Anna Węgrzyn (POL) | 2 | 0 | 6 | 2 | 88 | 64 | X | 3–2 | 3–0 |
| 2 | Wirakaran Tayapitak (THA) | 1 | 1 | 5 | 3 | 81 | 70 | 2–3 | X | 3–0 |
| 3 | Janissa Cheng (SGP) | 0 | 2 | 0 | 6 | 31 | 66 | 0–3 | 0–3 | X |

=== Group 32 ===
| Rank | Athlete | W | L | GW | GL | PW | PL | NED | HUN | MDA |
|---|---|---|---|---|---|---|---|---|---|---|
| 1 | Dobrila Jorguseska (NED) | 2 | 0 | 6 | 1 | 76 | 47 | X | 3–0 | 3–1 |
| 2 | Dorina Hudák (HUN) | 1 | 1 | 3 | 3 | 53 | 57 | 0–3 | X | 3–0 |
| 3 | Camelia Merenco (MDA) | 0 | 2 | 1 | 6 | 50 | 75 | 1–3 | 0–3 | X |

=== Group 33 ===
| Rank | Athlete | W | L | GW | GL | PW | PL | AIN | CAN | CRC |
|---|---|---|---|---|---|---|---|---|---|---|
| 1 | Elizabet Abraamian (AIN) | 2 | 0 | 6 | 0 | 66 | 24 | X | 3–0 | 3–0 |
| 2 | Crystal Liu (CAN) | 1 | 1 | 3 | 3 | 45 | 51 | 0–3 | X | 3–0 |
| 3 | Victoria Castro (CRC) | 0 | 2 | 0 | 6 | 31 | 67 | 0–3 | 0–3 | X |

== Knockout stage ==
A single-elimination bracket where losing meant instant elimination. Following FISU tournament standards for major phases, matches in the final tournament bracket were played in a best-of-seven sets format. The first player to reach 11 points (with a 2-point lead) secured a set. In line with standard tournament traditions, both losing semifinalists automatically received a bronze medal without playing a third-place match.

=== Section 1 ===
Round of 128
N Grigelová (SVK) | 5 | 6 | 12 | 11 | 11 | 11
A Chiriacova (MDA) | 11 | 11 | 10 | 7 | 6 | 1
E Abraamian (AIN) | 11 | 11 | 11 | 11
K Abilzade (AZE) | 2 | 6 | 5 | 6

Round of 64
Wang Xt (CHN) | 4 | 11 | 11 | 9 | 11 | 11
N Grigelová (SVK) | 11 | 1 | 4 | 11 | 4 | 3
Seak HL (MAC) | 5 | 6 | 2 | 5
C Picard (FRA) | 11 | 11 | 11 | 11
Lee HM (HKG) | 11 | 11 | 11 | 11
A Fejős (HUN) | 5 | 2 | 2 | 4
E Abraamian (AIN) | 11 | 11 | 11 | RET
E Haraç (TUR) | 8 | 1 | 4

Round of 32
Wang Xt (CHN) | 11 | 11 | 11 | 11
C Picard (FRA) | 5 | 3 | 5 | 9
Lee HM (HKG) | 11 | 11 | 4 | 8 | 7 | 4
E Abraamian (AIN) | 9 | 9 | 11 | 11 | 11 | 11

Round of 16
Wang Xt (CHN) | 11 | 13 | 11 | 11
E Abraamian (AIN) | 6 | 11 | 6 | 5

=== Section 2 ===
Round of 128
Y Tsutsui (GER) | 11 | 8 | 11 | 11 | 7 | 13
A Wang (USA) | 6 | 11 | 8 | 9 | 11 | 11
E Bat-Erdene (MGL) | 4 | 2 | 2 | 5
I Liao (CAN) | 11 | 11 | 11 | 11

Round of 64
K Węgrzyn (POL) | 11 | 11 | 11 | 11
Y Tsutsui (GER) | 6 | 8 | 7 | 7
I Matos (POR) | 11 | 8 | 11 | 13 | 5 | 14 | 7
Lee De (KOR) | 0 | 11 | 13 | 11 | 11 | 12 | 11
Tsai Ye (TPE) | 11 | 11 | 11 | 11
E Ernst (NED) | 5 | 4 | 9 | 5
I Liao (CAN) | 5 | 8 | 2 | 2
K Idesawa (JPN) | 11 | 11 | 11 | 11

Round of 32
K Węgrzyn (POL) | 11 | 3 | 12 | 11 | 13 | 11 | 11
Lee De (KOR) | 9 | 11 | 10 | 13 | 15 | 7 | 7
Tsai Ye (TPE) | 11 | 7 | 4 | 3
K Idesawa (JPN) | 13 | 11 | 11 | 11

Round of 16
K Węgrzyn (POL) | 10 | 7 | 3 | 13
K Idesawa (JPN) | 12 | 11 | 11 | 15

=== Section 3 ===
Round of 128
A Illášová (SVK) | 11 | 11 | 11 | 11
C Infante (CHI) | 7 | 5 | 3 | 6
N Erdene (MGL) | 5 | 3 | 7 | 1
A Avezou (FRA) | 11 | 11 | 11 | 11
E Tan (USA) | 11 | 9 | 8 | 12 | 11 | 11
E Arslan (TUR) | 3 | 11 | 11 | 10 | 5 | 8

Round of 64
I Singeorzan (ROU) | 13 | 11 | 8 | 12 | 11
A Illášová (SVK) | 11 | 4 | 11 | 10 | 8
A Węgrzyn (POL) | 4 | 8 | 10 | 0
Zhao S (CHN) | 11 | 11 | 12 | 11
S Aoi (JPN) | 12 | 11 | 11 | 11
A Avezou (FRA) | 10 | 6 | 3 | 3
E Tan (USA) | 11 | 3 | 4 | 8 | 7
Z Akasheva (KAZ) | 4 | 11 | 11 | 11 | 11

Round of 32
I Singeorzan (ROU) | 4 | 5 | 11 | 2 | 10
Zhao S (CHN) | 11 | 11 | 8 | 11 | 12
S Aoi (JPN) | 11 | 13 | 11 | 8 | 11 | 8 | 11
Z Akasheva (KAZ) | 9 | 15 | 1 | 11 | 1 | 11 | 5

Round of 16
Zhao S (CHN) | 11 | 13 | 9 | 12 | 11 | 11
S Aoi (JPN) | 4 | 15 | 11 | 10 | 8 | 9

=== Section 4 ===
Round of 128
E Labošová (SVK) | 11 | 11 | 11 | 11
N Siwrathne (SRI) | 3 | 6 | 3 | 8
A Pavlović (CRO) | 11 | 8 | 8 | 5 | 10
H Dari (HUN) | 8 | 11 | 11 | 11 | 12

Round of 64
F Schreiner (GER) | 11 | 11 | 10 | 6 | 11 | 9 | 15
E Labošová (SVK) | 6 | 5 | 12 | 11 | 5 | 11 | 17
C Lai (SGP) | 11 | 7 | 10 | 6 | 8
Wong HT (HKG) | 9 | 11 | 12 | 11 | 11
S Saini (IND) | 8 | 11 | 9 | 11 | 11 | 11
D Jorguseska (NED) | 11 | 4 | 11 | 3 | 5 | 3
H Dari (HUN) | 6 | 5 | 11 | 6 | 3
Chien Tc (TPE) | 11 | 11 | 7 | 11 | 11

Round of 32
E Labošová (SVK) | 7 | 11 | 11 | 11 | 11
Wong HT (HKG) | 11 | 7 | 3 | 8 | 9
S Saini (IND) | 11 | 3 | 1 | 3 | 7
Chien Tc (TPE) | 8 | 11 | 11 | 11 | 11

Round of 16
E Labošová (SVK) | 8 | 7 | 10 | 11 | 6
Chien Tc (TPE) | 11 | 11 | 12 | 9 | 11

=== Section 5 ===
Round of 128
M Ali (QAT) | 4 | 3 | 7 | 3
L Maurer (SUI) | 11 | 11 | 11 | 11
J Sung (USA) | 3 | 5 | 8 | 11 | 4
T Kotecha (IND) | 11 | 11 | 11 | 9 | 11

Round of 64
Han Fe (CHN) | 11 | 11 | 11 | 11
L Maurer (SUI) | 1 | 6 | 5 | 4
M Magdieva (UZB) | 11 | 9 | 11 | 2 | 11 | 11 | 6
J Sawettabut (THA) | 7 | 11 | 5 | 11 | 9 | 13 | 11
E Ungvári (ROU) | 11 | 4 | 10 | 4
Tan ZY (SGP) | 13 | 11 | 12 | 11
T Kotecha (IND) | 12 | 2 | 10 | 13 | 8 | 6
K Omoda (JPN) | 10 | 11 | 12 | 11 | 11 | 11

Round of 32
Han Fe (CHN) | 11 | 11 | 11 | 11
J Sawettabut (THA) | 7 | 8 | 8 | 6
Tan ZY (SGP) | 8 | 9 | 8 | 5
K Omoda (JPN) | 11 | 11 | 11 | 11

Round of 16
Han Fe (CHN) | 8 | 9 | 15 | 9 | 7
K Omoda (JPN) | 11 | 11 | 13 | 11 | 11

=== Section 6 ===
Round of 128
K van Lierop (NED) | 11 | 11 | 9 | 11 | 11
Gwon Yh (KOR) | 6 | 6 | 11 | 5 | 9
I Sztwiertnia (POL) | 7 | 11 | 11 | 7 | 11 | 10
A Teglas (ROU) | 11 | 8 | 6 | 11 | 13 | 12
S Klee (GER) | 11 | 11 | 13 | 11
T Rodrigo (SRI) | 8 | 5 | 11 | 6

Round of 64
Cheng Ps (TPE) | 11 | 9 | 11 | 11 | 11
K van Lierop (NED) | 2 | 11 | 9 | 6 | 6
A Teglas (ROU) | 9 | 5 | 2 | 11 | 4
I Cok (FRA) | 11 | 11 | 11 | 4 | 11
H Udoaka (NGR) | 5 | 11 | 1 | 7 | 4
P Santos (POR) | 11 | 8 | 11 | 11 | 11
S Klee (GER) | 8 | 7 | 11 | 6
Ng WL (HKG) | 11 | 11 | 13 | 11

Round of 32
Cheng Ps (TPE) | 11 | 11 | 11 | 11 | 11
I Cok (FRA) | 6 | 4 | 13 | 9 | 5
P Santos (POR) | 2 | 8 | 4 | 4
Ng WL (HKG) | 11 | 11 | 11 | 11

Round of 16
Cheng Ps (TPE) | 11 | 11 | 6 | 11 | 6 | 6 | 9
Ng WL (HKG) | 9 | 9 | 11 | 7 | 11 | 11 | 11

=== Section 7 ===
Round of 128
A Tan (USA) | 16 | 8 | 13 | 8 | 3
Im Ja (KOR) | 14 | 11 | 15 | 11 | 11
BE Batmunkh (MGL) | 5 | 12 | 6 | 8 | 8
W Tayapitak (THA) | 11 | 10 | 11 | 11 | 11

Round of 64
C Lutz (FRA) | 11 | 11 | 11 | 11
Im Ja (KOR) | 6 | 5 | 7 | 7
M Tailakova (AIN) | 7 | 11 | 7 | 12 | 3
A Brzyska (POL) | 11 | 8 | 11 | 14 | 11
P Vartikar (IND) | 5 | 11 | 7 | 7 | 17 | 4
Ö Yılmaz (TUR) | 11 | 8 | 11 | 11 | 15 | 11
W Tayapitak (THA) | 5 | 1 | 9 | 5
Huang Yj (TPE) | 11 | 11 | 11 | 11

Round of 32
C Lutz (FRA) | 11 | 11 | 11 | 11 | 5 | 11
A Brzyska (POL) | 13 | 4 | 5 | 9 | 11 | 9
Ö Yılmaz (TUR) | 11 | 11 | 7 | 9 | 10 | 6
Huang Yj (TPE) | 7 | 8 | 11 | 11 | 12 | 11

Round of 16
C Lutz (FRA) | 3 | 11 | 12 | 8 | 6 | 6
Huang Yj (TPE) | 11 | 6 | 10 | 11 | 11 | 11

=== Section 8 ===
Round of 128
N Kola (THA) | 11 | 6 | 9 | 11 | 13 | 7 | 12
C Liu (CAN) | 7 | 11 | 11 | 7 | 11 | 11 | 10
S Wani (IND) | 11 | 11 | 11 | 11
D Hudák (HUN) | 3 | 4 | 3 | 7

Round of 64
E Zaharia (ROU) | 11 | 11 | 11 | 11
N Kola (THA) | 8 | 3 | 3 | 4
M Asada (JPN) | 11 | 2 | 7 | 4 | 6
Kong TL (HKG) | 6 | 11 | 11 | 11 | 11
S Men (NED) | 11 | 12 | 12 | 11 | 11 | 8 | 7
L Lachenmayer (GER) | 1 | 14 | 10 | 13 | 8 | 11 | 11
S Wani (IND) | 6 | 5 | 7 | 5
Yang Yy (CHN) | 11 | 11 | 11 | 11

Round of 32
E Zaharia (ROU) | 11 | 7 | 8 | 8 | 8
M Asada (JPN) | 6 | 11 | 11 | 11 | 11
L Lachenmayer (GER) | 11 | 6 | 6 | 7 | 4
Yang Yy (CHN) | 8 | 11 | 11 | 11 | 11

Round of 16
M Asada (JPN) | 11 | 11 | 14 | 9 | 11 | 3 | 11
Yang Yy (CHN) | 3 | 6 | 16 | 11 | 3 | 11 | 9

=== Finals ===
Quarterfinals
Wang Xt (CHN) | 5 | 11 | 12 | 10 | 11 | 11
K Idesawa (JPN) | 11 | 6 | 10 | 12 | 7 | 9
Zhao S (CHN) | 11 | 11 | 11 | 11
Chien Tc (TPE) | 3 | 7 | 6 | 5
K Omoda (JPN) | 13 | 8 | 7 | 10 | 9
Ng WL (HKG) | 15 | 11 | 11 | 12 | 11
Huang Yj (TPE) | 7 | 11 | 11 | 11 | 6 | 6 | 11
M Asada (JPN) | 11 | 9 | 4 | 8 | 11 | 11 | 9

Semifinals
Wang Xt (CHN) | 8 | 11 | 11 | 12 | 8 | 7 | 8
Zhao S (CHN) | 11 | 6 | 3 | 10 | 11 | 11 | 11
Ng WL (HKG) | 8 | 11 | 5 | 9 | 3
Huang Yj (TPE) | 11 | 8 | 11 | 11 | 11

Final
Zhao S (CHN) | 11 | 11 | 13 | 11
Huang Yj (TPE) | 8 | 9 | 11 | 5
