= Swimming at the 2025 Summer World University Games – Men's 800 metre freestyle =

Men's 800 metre freestyle at the 2025 Summer World University Games
- Venue: Schwimm- und Sprunghalle im Europasportpark
- Location: Berlin
- Dates: 21 July (heats); 22 July (final)
- Competitors: 11 from 8 nations

Medalists
gold medal	Aleksandr Stepanov	Individual Neutral Athletes
silver medal	Tommaso Griffante	Italy
bronze medal	Ryan Erisman	United States

The men's 800 metre freestyle at the 2025 Summer World University Games in Rhine-Ruhr, Germany was held from 21 to 22 July 2025. Aleksandr Stepanov from Individual Neutral Athletes won the gold medal, Tommaso Griffante from Italy took the silver medal and Ryan Erisman from the United States earned the bronze medal.

== Schedule ==
All times are Central European Time (UTC+1)

Date	Time	Round
21 July	10:57	Heats
22 July	19:15	Final

== Records ==
Prior to the competition, the world and Universiade records were as follows.

Category	Swimmer	Record	Date	Place	Event
World record	(China) Zhang Lin	7:32.12	29 July 2009	Rome, Italy	2009 World Championships
Universiade record	(Italy) Gregorio Paltrinieri	7:45.76	24 August 2017	Taipei, Chinese Taipei	2017 Summer Universiade

== Results ==
=== Heats ===
All entered athletes competed across multiple seeded heats in the morning session. Swimmers with the top 8 fastest times advanced, regardless of which individual heat they swam.

Rank	Heat	Lane	Swimmer	Nation	Time	Notes
1	2	3	Tommaso Griffante	Italy	7:55.78	Q
2	2	4	Aleksandr Stepanov	Individual Neutral Athletes	8:00.75	Q
3	2	6	Kyo Nakayama	Japan	8:02.13	Q
4	2	7	Daichi Yamamoto	Japan	8:02.33	Q
5	2	2	João Campos	Brazil	8:02.65	Q
6	1	5	Ryan Erisman	United States	8:02.81	Q
7	1	2	Simon Reinke	Germany	8:03.45	Q
8	1	4	Davide Marchello	Italy	8:04.08	Q
9	1	3	Thiago Ruffini	Brazil	8:04.34	
10	1	7	Cho Seung-been	South Korea	8:13.75	
11	1	6	Ahmet Isik	Turkey	8:38.04	

=== Final ===
The fastest 8 swimmers competed in a single race to determine the gold, silver and bronze medalists.

Rank	Lane	Swimmer	Nation	Time	Notes
1st place, gold medalist(s)	5	Aleksandr Stepanov	Individual Neutral Athletes	7:46.51	
2nd place, silver medalist(s)	4	Tommaso Griffante	Italy	7:50.50	
3rd place, bronze medalist(s)	7	Ryan Erisman	United States	7:51.74	
4	8	Davide Marchello	Italy	7:54.73	
5	2	João Campos	Brazil	7:56.43	
6	1	Simon Reinke	Germany	8:01.16	
7	3	Kyo Nakayama	Japan	8:02.55	
8	6	Daichi Yamamoto	Japan	8:10.52	
