= Judo at the 2025 Summer World University Games – Men's 66 kg =

Men's 66 kg at the 2025 Summer World University Games
- Venue: Messe Essen
- Location: Essen
- Dates: 23 July
- Competitors: 33

Medalists
gold medal	Kairi Kentoku	Japan
silver medal	Abrek Naguchev	Individual Neutral Athletes
bronze medal	Henrique Silva	Brazil
bronze medal	Nurkanat Serikbayev	Kazakhstan

The men's 66 kg at the 2025 Summer World University Games in Rhine-Ruhr, Germany was held 23 July 2025. Kairi Kentoku of Japan captured the gold medal. Abrek Naguchev of Individual Neutral Athletes took home the silver medal. The bronze medals were awarded to Henrique Silva of Brazil and Nurkanat Serikbayev of Kazakhstan.

== Schedule ==
All times are Central European Time (UTC+1)

Date	Time	Event
23 July 2015	09:00	Preliminary Rounds
23 July 2015	17:00	Final Block

== Results ==
Athletes advanced through direct knockout rounds—including the round of 32, round of 16, quarterfinals, and semifinals—to determine the two finalists fighting for the gold and silver medals. Parallel to the main bracket, a repechage system allowed defeated quarterfinalists to work their way back into the tournament, culminating in two separate bronze medal matches where the repechage winners faced the losing semifinalists.

Round of 64
A Dvořáček (CZE)	110
T Hrnčiar (SVK)	000

Round of 32
A Naguchev (AIN)	100
K Manomai (THA)	000
D Ickes (GER)	010 (yellow card)
J Ayala (ECU)	000
B Máthé (HUN)	111
M Bata (USA)	000 (yellow card)
S Chantha (CAM)	000
H Silva (BRA)	100
M Auer (AUT)	100 (yellow card)
D Altemirov (BEL)	000
A Dvořáček (CZE)	000
N Serikbayev (KAZ)	012
S Lesauvage (FRA)	001
K Yrysbekov (KGZ)	000
G Zadravec (SLO)	000 (yellow card)
M Norkevičius (LTU)	001 (yellow card)
M Holoborodko (UKR)	110 (yellow card)
Yoon Hs (KOR)	010
E St-Hilaire (HAI)	000
N Talibov (AZE)	100
P Christodoulides (CYP)	100
T Tumurkhuu (MGL)	000
A Kocabey (TUR)	000
M Kadian (IND)	100
K Kentoku (JPN)	101
D Aghasyan (ARM)	000
R Cáceres (CHI)	011
M Tomašević (CRO)	100
A De Luca (ITA)	110 (yellow card)
J van Harten (NED)	000 (yellow card)
D Cervantes (ESP)	000
K Gaprindashvili (GEO)	110

Round of 16
A Naguchev (AIN)	001
D Ickes (GER)	000
B Máthé (HUN)	000
H Silva (BRA)	100
M Auer (AUT)	000 (yellow card)
N Serikbayev (KAZ)	100 (yellow card)
S Lesauvage (FRA)	100 (yellow card)
M Norkevičius (LTU)	000
M Holoborodko (UKR)	110
N Talibov (AZE)	011 (yellow card)
P Christodoulides (CYP)	100 (yellow card)
M Kadian (IND)	000
K Kentoku (JPN)	100
M Tomašević (CRO)	000
A De Luca (ITA)	000
K Gaprindashvili (GEO)	001

Quarter-finals
A Naguchev (AIN)	001
H Silva (BRA)	000
N Serikbayev (KAZ)	020
S Lesauvage (FRA)	000 (yellow card)
M Holoborodko (UKR)	001
P Christodoulides (CYP)	100
K Kentoku (JPN)	010
K Gaprindashvili (GEO)	000

Semi-finals
A Naguchev (AIN)	100
N Serikbayev (KAZ)	011
P Christodoulides (CYP)	000
K Kentoku (JPN)	100

Final
A Naguchev (AIN)	000
K Kentoku (JPN)	110

Repechage Phases

Repechage
H Silva (BRA)	011
S Lesauvage (FRA)	002
M Holoborodko (UKR)	020 (yellow card)
K Gaprindashvili (GEO)	001

Bronze medal
H Silva (BRA)	010 (yellow card)
P Christodoulides (CYP)	000 (yellow card)
M Holoborodko (UKR)	000 (yellow card)
N Serikbayev (KAZ)	020 (yellow card)
