= Swimming at the 2025 Summer World University Games – Men's 1500 metre freestyle =

Men's 1500 metre freestyle at the 2025 Summer World University Games
- Venue: Schwimm- und Sprunghalle im Europasportpark
- Location: Berlin
- Dates: 19 July (heats); 20 July (final)
- Competitors: 11 from 7 nations

Medalists
gold medal	Aleksandr Stepanov	Individual Neutral Athletes
silver medal	Ivan Giovannoni	Italy
bronze medal	Davide Marchello	Italy

The men's 1500 metre freestyle at the 2025 Summer World University Games in Rhine-Ruhr, Germany was held from 19 to 20 July 2025. Aleksandr Stepanov from Individual Neutral Athletes won the gold medal, Ivan Giovannoni from Italy took the silver medal and Davide Marchello from Italy earned the bronze medal.

== Schedule ==
All times are Central European Time (UTC+1)

Date	Time	Round
19 July	10:03	Heats
20 July	19:16	Final

== Records ==
Prior to the competition, the world and Universiade records were as follows.

Category	Swimmer	Record	Date	Place	Event
World record	(United States) Bobby Finke	14:30.67	4 August 2024	Paris, France	2024 Summer Olympics
Universiade record	(Italy) Gregorio Paltrinieri	14:47.75	22 August 2017	Taipei, Chinese Taipei	2017 Summer Universiade

== Results ==
=== Heats ===
All entered athletes competed across multiple seeded heats in the morning session. Swimmers with the top 8 fastest times advanced, regardless of which individual heat they swam.

Rank	Heat	Lane	Swimmer	Nation	Time	Notes
1	2	2	João Campos	Brazil	15:12.87	Q
2	2	5	Davide Marchello	Italy	15:17.29	Q
3	1	3	Thiago Ruffini	Brazil	15:19.94	Q
4	1	4	Carson Hick	United States	15:20.26	Q
5	1	5	Daichi Yamamoto	Japan	15:20.70	Q
6	2	3	Ivan Giovannoni	Italy	15:20.90	Q
7	2	4	Aleksandr Stepanov	Individual Neutral Athletes	15:23.20	Q
8	1	6	Kyo Nakayama	Japan	15:26.70	Q
9	1	2	Simon Reinke	Germany	15:29.96	
10	2	6	Alec Enyeart	United States	15:33.35	
11	2	7	Righardt Muller	South Africa	15:43.19	

=== Final ===
The fastest 8 swimmers competed in a single race to determine the gold, silver and bronze medalists.

Rank	Lane	Swimmer	Nation	Time	Notes
1st place, gold medalist(s)	1	Aleksandr Stepanov	Individual Neutral Athletes	14:55.98	
2nd place, silver medalist(s)	7	Ivan Giovannoni	Italy	14:56.10	
3rd place, bronze medalist(s)	5	Davide Marchello	Italy	15:06.95	
4	4	João Campos	Brazil	15:11.44	
5	3	Thiago Ruffini	Brazil	15:15.10	
6	6	Carson Hick	United States	15:17.45	
7	8	Kyo Nakayama	Japan	15:27.08	
8	2	Daichi Yamamoto	Japan	15:31.41	
