= Diving at the 2025 Summer World University Games – Women's 1 metre springboard =

Women's 1 metre springboard at the 2025 Summer World University Games
- Venue: Schwimm- und Sprunghalle im Europasportpark
- Location: Berlin
- Dates: 22 July (preliminary); 23 July (final)
- Competitors: 23 from 12 nations

Medalists
gold medal	Ouyang Yu	China
silver medal	Wang Yi	China
bronze medal	Avery Giese	United States

The women's 1 metre springboard at the 2025 Summer World University Games in Rhine-Ruhr, Germany was held from 22 to 23 July 2025. The gold medal was won by Ouyang Yu (China), the silver medal by Wang Yi (China) and the bronze medal by Avery Giese (United States).

== Schedule ==
All times are Central European Time (UTC+1)

Date	Time	Round
22 July 2025	11:40	Preliminary
23 July 2025	11:30	Final

== Results ==
23 divers entered the event, representing 12 nations. A maximum of two players per nation advanced to the final.

Rank	Name	Nation	Preliminary		Final					
Rank	Name	Nation	Score	Rank	Dive 1	Dive 2	Dive 3	Dive 4	Dive 5	Total
1st place, gold medalist(s)	Ouyang Yu	China	272.50	1	54.00	58.50	56.35	58.80	46.20	273.85
2nd place, silver medalist(s)	Wang Yi	China	267.85	2	56.40	50.70	51.75	52.80	54.60	266.25
3rd place, bronze medalist(s)	Avery Giese	United States	246.25	4	51.60	53.30	47.15	50.40	49.40	251.85
4	Katerina Hoffman	United States	223.45	9	50.40	50.70	49.40	48.30	50.40	249.20
5	Kim Na-hyun	South Korea	221.70	10	52.80	52.00	47.15	50.40	45.50	247.85
6	Kiarra Milligan	Australia	227.85	8	48.30	50.40	50.70	50.40	42.90	242.70
7	Erika Sazonova	Individual Neutral Athletes	217.65	13	50.40	50.70	48.30	43.20	45.00	237.60
8	Oh Soo-yeon	South Korea	229.85	7	49.20	44.85	49.20	46.80	46.80	236.85
9	Matilde Borello	Italy	233.70	5	52.80	46.00	28.80	50.70	50.70	229.00
10	Heloá Camelo	Brazil	217.20	14	44.85	39.60	42.90	39.00	45.60	211.95
11	Elettra Neroni	Italy	231.20	6	47.15	46.80	19.50	46.80	46.80	207.05
12	Bailey Heydra	South Africa	218.85	12	43.20	45.50	34.50	26.40	45.50	195.10
13	Mei Yingxin	China	267.65	3	Did not advance					
14	Eliana Joyce	United States	220.10	11	Did not advance					
15	Oona Abbema	Netherlands	207.70	15	Did not advance					
16	Patrícia Kun	Hungary	203.95	16	Did not advance					
17	Rebeca Nascimento	Brazil	203.00	17	Did not advance					
18	Hana Kondo	Japan	197.95	18	Did not advance					
19	Grace Brammer	South Africa	183.45	19	Did not advance					
20	Sakura Morioka	Japan	182.10	20	Did not advance					
21	Mariami Shanidze	Georgia	176.65	21	Did not advance					
22	Kerry-Leigh Morrison	South Africa	168.45	22	Did not advance					
23	Kim Seung-hyun	South Korea	165.40	23	Did not advance					
