= Diving at the 2025 Summer World University Games – Women's 3 metre springboard =

Women's 3 metre springboard at the 2025 Summer World University Games
- Venue: Schwimm- und Sprunghalle im Europasportpark
- Location: Berlin
- Dates: 20 July (preliminary); 21 July (final)
- Competitors: 25 from 12 nations

Medalists
gold medal	Wang Weiying	China
silver medal	Qu Zhixin	China
bronze medal	Lena Hentschel	Germany

The women's 3 metre springboard at the 2025 Summer World University Games in Rhine-Ruhr, Germany was held from 20 to 21 July 2025. The gold medal was won by Wang Weiying (China), the silver medal by Qu Zhixin (China) and the bronze medal by Lena Hentschel (Germany).

== Schedule ==
All times are Central European Time (UTC+1)

Date	Time	Round
20 July 2025	11:50	Preliminary
21 July 2025	15:30	Final

== Results ==
25 divers entered the event, representing 12 nations. A maximum of two players per nation advanced to the final.

Rank	Name	Nation	Preliminary		Final					
Rank	Name	Nation	Score	Rank	Dive 1	Dive 2	Dive 3	Dive 4	Dive 5	Total
1st place, gold medalist(s)	Wang Weiying	China	319.70	2	67.50	69.75	73.50	67.50	66.00	344.25
2nd place, silver medalist(s)	Qu Zhixin	China	332.00	1	51.00	67.50	69.00	63.55	67.50	318.55
3rd place, bronze medalist(s)	Lena Hentschel	Germany	301.60	3	54.00	58.50	40.50	58.50	54.25	265.75
4	Jette Müller	Germany	294.30	4	49.50	54.00	54.00	60.00	48.05	265.55
5	Katerina Hoffman	United States	262.50	8	56.70	33.60	58.50	51.80	58.80	259.40
6	Oh Soo-yeon	South Korea	265.50	6	44.40	45.00	49.50	63.00	53.20	255.10
7	Kiarra Milligan	Australia	229.60	14	58.05	54.60	50.40	39.20	36.00	238.25
8	Oona Abbema	Netherlands	241.80	11	44.55	43.40	46.50	49.50	54.00	237.95
9	Bailey Heydra	South Africa	230.30	13	48.60	50.40	37.80	46.50	40.50	223.80
10	Avery Giese	United States	245.90	10	52.65	37.80	49.00	33.60	39.15	212.20
11	Patrícia Kun	Hungary	252.30	9	49.50	46.00	40.50	49.50	22.50	208.50
12	Sakura Morioka	Japan	274.40	5	54.60	35.00	32.20	52.50	30.00	204.30
13	Wang Yi	China	264.20	7	Did not advance					
14	Violet Williamson	United States	235.65	12	Did not advance					
15	Choi Yu-jeong	South Korea	217.55	15	Did not advance					
16	Grace Brammer	South Africa	212.05	16	Did not advance					
17	Erika Sazonova	Individual Neutral Athletes	207.80	17	Did not advance					
18	Rebeca Nascimento	Brazil	205.40	18	Did not advance					
19	Elettra Neroni	Italy	191.05	19	Did not advance					
20	Hana Kondo	Japan	190.50	20	Did not advance					
21	Heloá Camelo	Brazil	178.70	21	Did not advance					
22	Kim Ye-lim	South Korea	173.90	22	Did not advance					
23	Matilde Borello	Italy	160.00	23	Did not advance					
24	Kerry-Leigh Morrison	South Africa	151.80	24	Did not advance					
25	Uliana Manaenkova	Individual Neutral Athletes	126.20	25	Did not advance					
