= Swimming at the 2025 Summer World University Games – Men's 4 × 200 metre freestyle relay =

Men's 4 × 200 metre freestyle relay at the 2025 Summer World University Games
- Venue: Schwimm- und Sprunghalle im Europasportpark
- Location: Berlin
- Dates: 22 July (heats and final)
- Nations: 16

Medalists
| gold medal | Mitchell Schott; Baylor Nelson; Jack Dahlgren; Jacob Mitchell; Ryan Erisman; Owen McDonald | United States |
| silver medal | Nikolai Kolesnikov; Aleksandr Shchegolev; Dmitrii Zhavoronkov; Aleksandr Stepanov; Roman Akimov | Individual Neutral Athletes |
| bronze medal | Takumi Mori; Konosuke Yanagimoto; Takaki Hara; Hiroto Shimizu; Yuta Watanabe | Japan |

The men's 4 × 200 metre freestyle relay at the 2025 Summer World University Games in Rhine-Ruhr, Germany was held 22 July 2025. United States won the gold medal, Individual Neutral Athletes took the silver medal and Japan earned the bronze medal.

== Schedule ==
All times are Central European Time (UTC+1)

| Date | Time | Round |
|---|---|---|
| 22 July | 10:31 | Heats |
| 22 July | 21:12 | Final |

== Records ==
Prior to the competition, the world and Universiade records were as follows.

| Category | Team | Record | Date | Place | Event |
|---|---|---|---|---|---|
| World record | United States | 6:58.55 | 31 July 2009 | Rome, Italy | 2009 World Championships |
| Universiade record | Russia | 7:05.49 | 15 July 2013 | Kazan, Russia | 2013 Summer Universiade |

== Results ==
=== Heats ===
All entered teams competed across multiple seeded heats in the morning session. Teams with the top 8 fastest times advanced, regardless of which individual heat they swam.

| Rank | Heat | Lane | Nation | Swimmers | Time | Notes |
|---|---|---|---|---|---|---|
| 1 | 2 | 4 | United States | Mitchell Schott (1:46.23); Jack Dahlgren (1:46.11); Ryan Erisman (1:47.08); Owen McDonald (1:48.03) | 7:07.45 | Q |
| 2 | 1 | 5 | Individual Neutral Athletes | Nikolai Kolesnikov (1:48.03); Aleksandr Shchegolev (1:48.46); Dmitrii Zhavoronkov (1:49.83); Roman Akimov (1:50.39) | 7:16.71 | Q |
| 3 | 1 | 3 | Brazil | Eduardo Moraes (1:49.28); Vinicius Assunção (1:50.39); Leonardo Alcantara (1:48.69); Kaique Alves (1:48.54) | 7:16.90 | Q |
| 4 | 2 | 3 | Italy | Gianmarco Foglia (1:50.13); Claudio Faraci (1:49.73); Simone Spediacci (1:47.78); Giovanni Caserta (1:51.49) | 7:19.13 | Q |
| 5 | 1 | 6 | Malaysia | Khiew Hoe Yean (1:48.47); Arvin Chahal (1:48.14); Lim Yin Chuen (1:50.46); Tan Khai Xin (1:52.74) | 7:19.81 | Q |
| 6 | 2 | 5 | Japan | Hiroto Shimizu (1:49.06); Yuta Watanabe (1:49.57); Takumi Mori (1:50.53); Konosuke Yanagimoto (1:51.71) | 7:20.87 | Q |
| 7 | 2 | 2 | Switzerland | Tiago Behar (1:49.83); Mattia Mauri (1:51.07); Dominic Chtaini (1:51.48); Daniil Sokolovskiy (1:52.90) | 7:25.28 | Q |
| 8 | 2 | 6 | Australia | Marcus Da Silva (1:48.77); Gabriel Gorgas (1:49.28); Thomas Nankervis (1:53.67); Stuart Swinburn (1:54.91) | 7:26.63 | Q |
| 9 | 1 | 2 | South Africa | Arno Kruger (1:51.86); Righardt Muller (1:52.13); Cameron Casali (1:50.96); Dylan Wright (1:55.48) | 7:30.43 | |
| 10 | 2 | 7 | Estonia | Lars Kuljus (1:50.62); Siim Kesküla (1:52.12); Artjom Alteberg (1:55.45); Artur Tobler (1:56.25) | 7:34.44 | |
| 11 | 2 | 1 | India | Srihari Nataraj (1:51.85); Aneesh Gowda (1:54.64); Shivank Vishwanath (1:57.19); Shoan Ganguly (1:57.50) | 7:41.18 | |
| 12 | 1 | 4 | South Korea | Youn Hee-yun (1:55.15); Han Seung-yun (1:54.76); Kim Min-jun (1:58.39); Cho Seung-been (1:54.09) | 7:42.39 | |
| 13 | 1 | 8 | Azerbaijan | Ramil Valizada (1:55.67); Rashad Alguliyev (1:59.19); Said Hamidov (1:57.79); Abdurrahman Rustamov (1:56.76) | 7:49.41 | |
| 14 | 2 | 8 | Singapore | Ephraim Tan (1:56.98); Sage Tan (1:54.93); Brandon Yap (1:54.28); Samuel Tang (2:06.22) | 7:52.41 | |
| 15 | 1 | 1 | Ecuador | Steven Jaramillo (1:57.95); Derek Velasco (2:01.36); Martín Álvarez (2:00.54); Emerson Pinto (2:07.39) | 8:07.24 | |
| 16 | 1 | 7 | Argentina | Nicolas Retrive (2:00.91); Gianluca Bertotto (2:08.39); Agustin Rasche (2:00.55); Juan Silva (2:25.76) | 8:35.61 | |

=== Final ===
The fastest 8 teams competed in a single race to determine the gold, silver and bronze medalists.

| Rank | Lane | Nation | Swimmers | Time | Notes |
|---|---|---|---|---|---|
| 1st place, gold medalist(s) | 4 | United States | Mitchell Schott (1:46.06); Baylor Nelson (1:46.52); Jack Dahlgren (1:51.72); Jacob Mitchell (1:46.79) | 7:04.51 | FR |
| 2nd place, silver medalist(s) | 5 | Individual Neutral Athletes | Nikolai Kolesnikov (1:46.02); Aleksandr Shchegolev (1:46.78); Dmitrii Zhavoronkov (1:47.47); Aleksandr Stepanov (1:48.06) | 7:08.33 | |
| 3rd place, bronze medalist(s) | 7 | Japan | Takumi Mori (1:47.36); Konosuke Yanagimoto (1:47.00); Takaki Hara (1:47.43); Hiroto Shimizu (1:47.68) | 7:09.47 | |
| 4 | 3 | Brazil | Eduardo Moraes (1:48.60); Kaique Alves (1:46.81); Leonardo Alcantara (1:48.10); Gustavo Saldo (1:48.50) | 7:12.01 | |
| 5 | 6 | Italy | Simone Spediacci (1:48.46); Giovanni Caserta (1:47.50); Claudio Faraci (1:48.96); Davide Marchello (1:48.91) | 7:13.83 | |
| 6 | 2 | Malaysia | Khiew Hoe Yean (1:48.11); Arvin Chahal (1:48.87); LimYin Chuen (1:50.58); Tan Khai Xin (1:52.10) | 7:19.66 | |
| 7 | 8 | Australia | Marcus Da Silva (1:48.46); Gabriel Gorgas (1:48.23); Thomas Nankervis (1:53.14); Stuart Swinburn (1:50.37) | 7:20.20 | |
| 8 | 1 | Switzerland | Tiago Behar (1:49.27); Mattia Mauri (1:52.63); Dominic Chtaini (1:52.46); Daniil Sokolovskiy (1:51.42) | 7:25.78 | |
