= Swimming at the 2025 Summer World University Games – Men's 200 metre individual medley =

Men's 200 metre individual medley at the 2025 Summer World University Games
- Venue: Schwimm- und Sprunghalle im Europasportpark
- Location: Berlin
- Dates: 18 July (heats and semifinals); 19 July (final)
- Competitors: 43 from 33 nations

Medalists
gold medal	Takumi Mori	Japan
silver medal	Mitchell Schott	United States
bronze medal	Yuta Watanabe	Japan

The men's 200 metre individual medley at the 2025 Summer World University Games in Rhine-Ruhr, Germany was held from 18 to 19 July 2025. Takumi Mori from Japan won the gold medal, Mitchell Schott from the United States took the silver medal and Yuta Watanabe from Japan earned the bronze medal.

== Schedule ==
All times are Central European Time (UTC+1)

Date	Time	Round
18 July	10:55	Heats
18 July	20:36	Semifinals
19 July	20:37	Final

== Records ==
Prior to the competition, the world and Universiade records were as follows.

Category	Swimmer	Record	Date	Place	Event
World record	(United States) Ryan Lochte	1:54.00	28 July 2011	Shanghai, China	2011 World Championships
Universiade record	(Japan) Kosuke Hagino	1:57.35	22 August 2017	Taipei, Chinese Taipei	2017 Summer Universiade

== Results ==
=== Heats ===
All entered athletes competed across multiple seeded heats in the morning session. Swimmers with the top 16 fastest times advanced, regardless of which individual heat they swam.

Rank	Heat	Lane	Swimmer	Nation	Time	Notes
1	5	5	Mitchell Schott	United States	1:59.39	Q
2	6	4	Owen McDonald	United States	1:59.74	Q
3	6	5	Yuta Watanabe	Japan	2:00.10	Q
4	5	4	Takumi Mori	Japan	2:00.18	Q
5	6	3	Eitan Ben Shitrit	Israel	2:00.20	Q
6	5	3	Jeremias Pock	Germany	2:00.35	Q
7	6	6	Simone Spediacci	Italy	2:00.47	Q
8	4	4	Aleksei Sudarev	Individual Neutral Athletes	2:00.95	Q
9	4	5	Vadym Naumenko	Ukraine	2:00.98	Q
10	4	6	Alexander Casey	Great Britain	2:01.00	Q
11	4	3	Gabriel Gorgas	Australia	2:01.30	Q
12	4	2	Sebastian Luňák	Czech Republic	2:01.69	Q
13	6	2	Diego Mira	Spain	2:01.88	Q
14	4	8	Kristaps Mikelsons	Latvia	2:02.21	Q
15	4	1	Fu Kun-ming	Chinese Taipei	2:02.25	Q
16	6	8	Daniil Pancerevas	Lithuania	2:02.33	Q
17	6	1	Ronny Brännkärr	Finland	2:02.79	
18	5	2	Collyn Gagne	Canada	2:02.99	
19	2	6	Filip Suchański	Poland	2:03.00	
20	6	7	Alberto Hernández	Spain	2:03.23	
21	5	8	Matheo Mateos	Paraguay	2:03.41	
22	5	7	Youn Hee-yun	South Korea	2:03.63	
23	4	7	Vinicius Assunção	Brazil	2:03.98	
24	3	4	Aibat Myrzamuratov	Kazakhstan	2:04.29	
25	5	1	Finn Kemp	Luxembourg	2:04.32	
26	3	5	Michal Judickij	Czech Republic	2:04.33	
27	3	2	Cameron Casali	South Africa	2:04.42	
28	3	7	Maxwell Seidel	Switzerland	2:04.67	
29	2	3	Shoun Ganguly	India	2:05.17	
30	2	5	Artur Tobler	Estonia	2:05.36	
31	3	1	Jaš Berložnik	Slovenia	2:05.68	
32	2	4	Matthew Randle	South Africa	2:06.89	
33	3	6	Tan Khai Xin	Malaysia	2:07.11	
34	2	2	Said Hamidov	Azerbaijan	2:07.91	
35	3	8	Oliver Kuulpak	Estonia	2:08.57	
36	2	1	Derek Velasco	Ecuador	2:12.39	
37	2	7	Martín Álvarez	Ecuador	2:13.46	
38	2	8	Anurag Singh	India	2:19.83	
39	1	4	Enzo Macedo	Argentina	2:21.32	
40	1	5	Sameer Asif	Pakistan	2:40.21	
41	1	6	Juan Silva	Argentina	2:49.38	
—	1	3	Bjourn Mhlanga	Zimbabwe	DNS	
—	5	6	Kim Ji-hun	South Korea	DSQ	

=== Semifinals ===
The 16 advancing swimmers were split into two semifinal heats of 8 during the evening session. The swimmers recording the top 8 fastest times advanced to the final round.

Rank	Heat	Lane	Swimmer	Nation	Time	Notes
1	2	4	Mitchell Schott	United States	1:58.95	Q
2	1	4	Owen McDonald	United States	1:59.28	Q
3	1	5	Takumi Mori	Japan	1:59.49	Q
4	2	5	Yuta Watanabe	Japan	1:59.60	Q
5	2	3	Eitan Ben Shitrit	Israel	1:59.97	Q
6	2	6	Simone Spediacci	Italy	2:00.21	Q
7	2	7	Gabriel Gorgas	Australia	2:00.38	Q
8	2	1	Diego Mira	Spain	2:00.47	Q
9	1	3	Jeremias Pock	Germany	2:00.62	
10	1	6	Aleksei Sudarev	Individual Neutral Athletes	2:00.96	
11	2	2	Vadym Naumenko	Ukraine	2:01.42	
12	1	2	Alexander Casey	Great Britain	2:02.12	
13	2	8	Fu Kun-ming	Chinese Taipei	2:02.26	
14	1	7	Sebastian Luňák	Czech Republic	2:02.28	
15	1	1	Kristaps Mikelsons	Latvia	2:02.43	
—	1	8	Daniil Pancerevas	Lithuania	DSQ	

=== Final ===
The fastest 8 swimmers competed in a single race to determine the gold, silver and bronze medalists.

Rank	Lane	Swimmer	Nation	Time	Notes
1st place, gold medalist(s)	3	Takumi Mori	Japan	1:57.24	FR
2nd place, silver medalist(s)	4	Mitchell Schott	United States	1:58.25	
3rd place, bronze medalist(s)	6	Yuta Watanabe	Japan	1:58.54	
4	5	Owen McDonald	United States	1:58.68	
5	7	Simone Spediacci	Italy	2:00.11	
6	2	Eitan Ben Shitrit	Israel	2:00.45	
7	1	Gabriel Gorgas	Australia	2:00.99	
8	8	Diego Mira	Spain	2:01.40	
