= Simone Mencarelli =

Italian fencer

Personal information
- Born: 24 May 2003 (age 23)

Fencing career
- Sport: Fencing
- Country: Italy
- Weapon: Épée
- FIE ranking: current ranking
Medal record
Representing Italy
Men's épée
European Championships
Gold medal – first place	2026 Antony	Individual
Gold medal – first place	2026 Antony	Team
World University Games
Bronze medal – third place	2021 Chengdu	Team
Bronze medal – third place	2025 Rhine-Ruhr	Team

Simone Mencarelli is an Italian fencer. He competed at the 2026 European Fencing Championships, winning two gold medals in the men's épée and the men's team épée events.
