= Essen =

- City
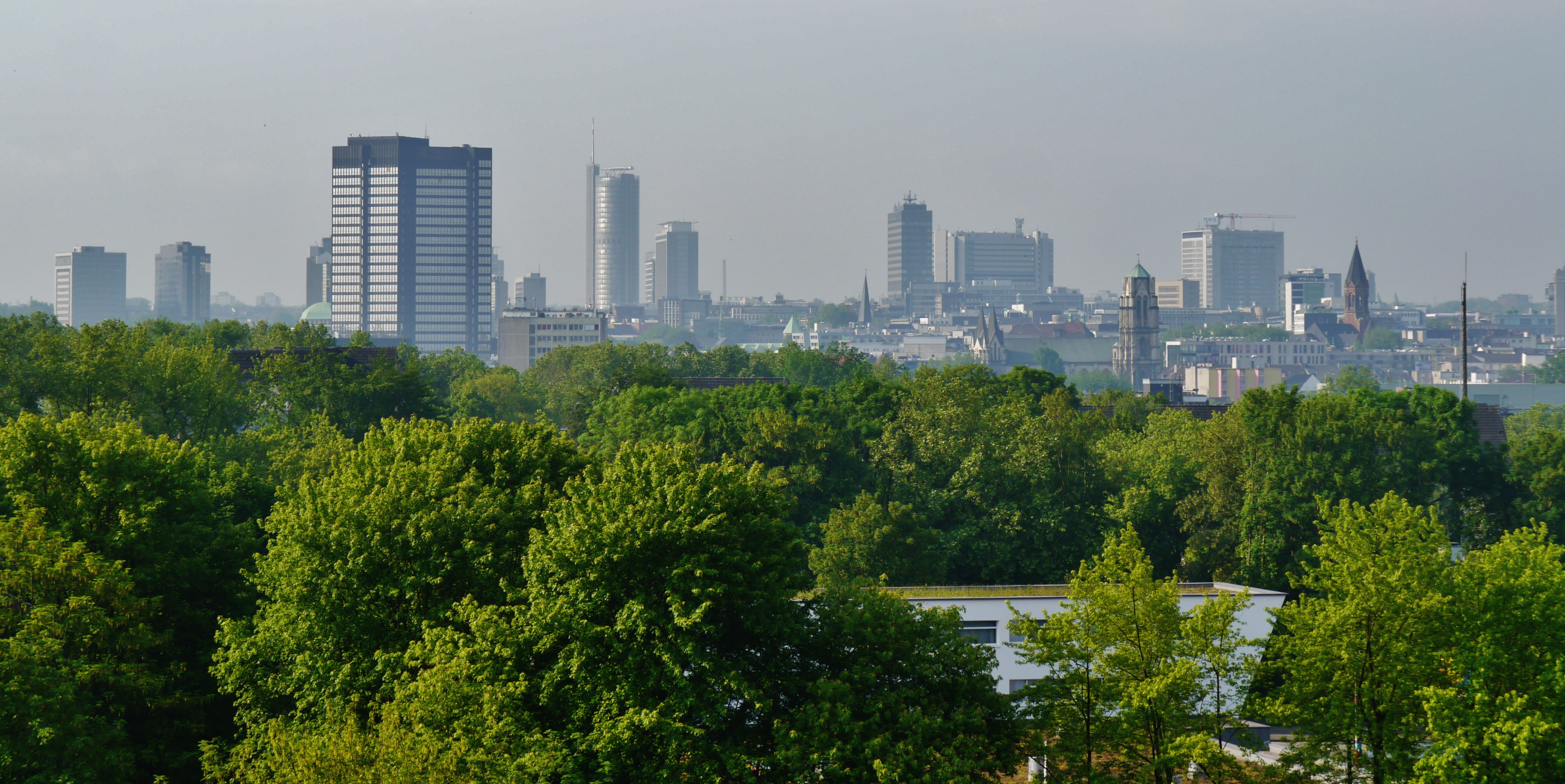
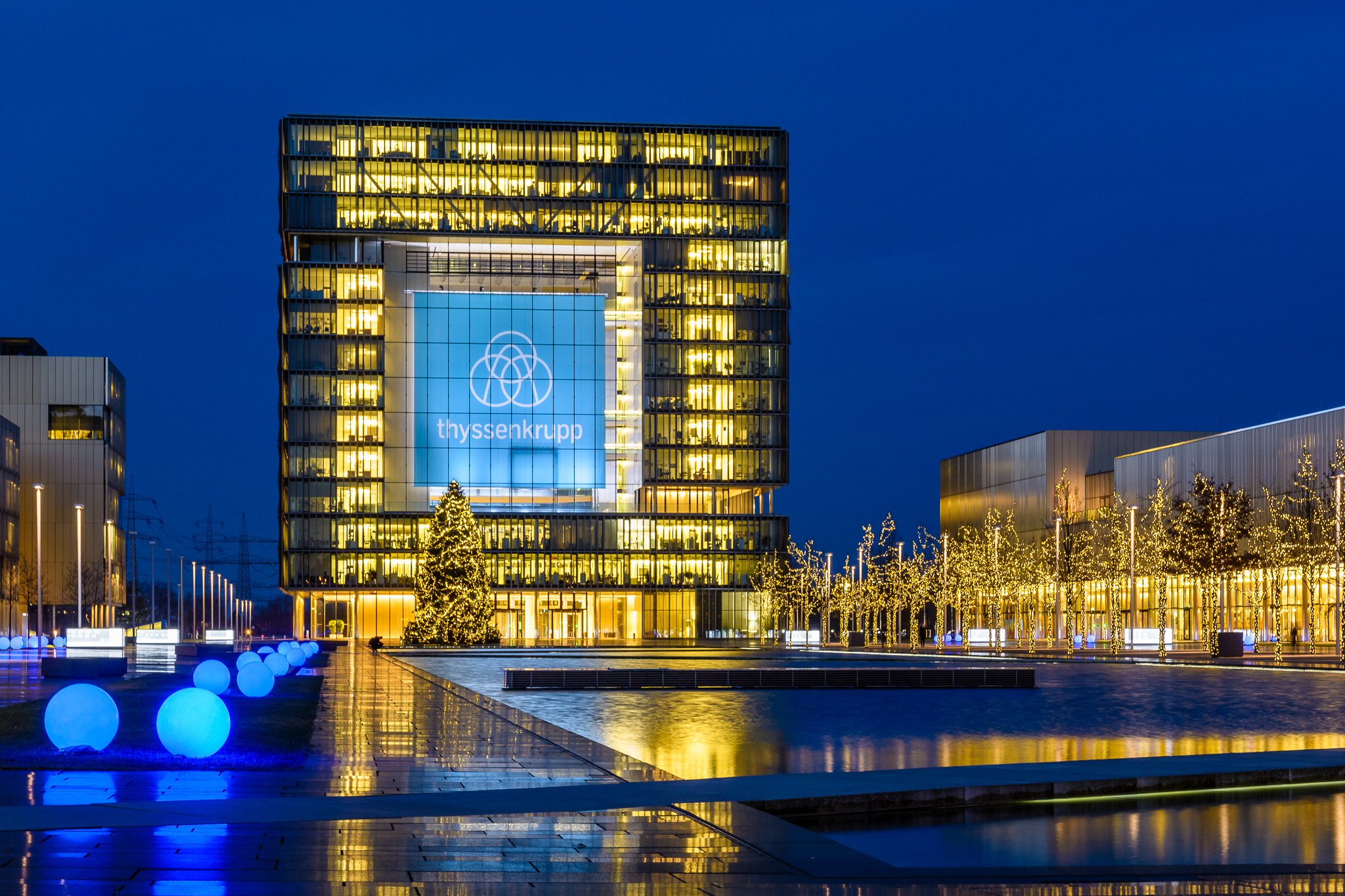
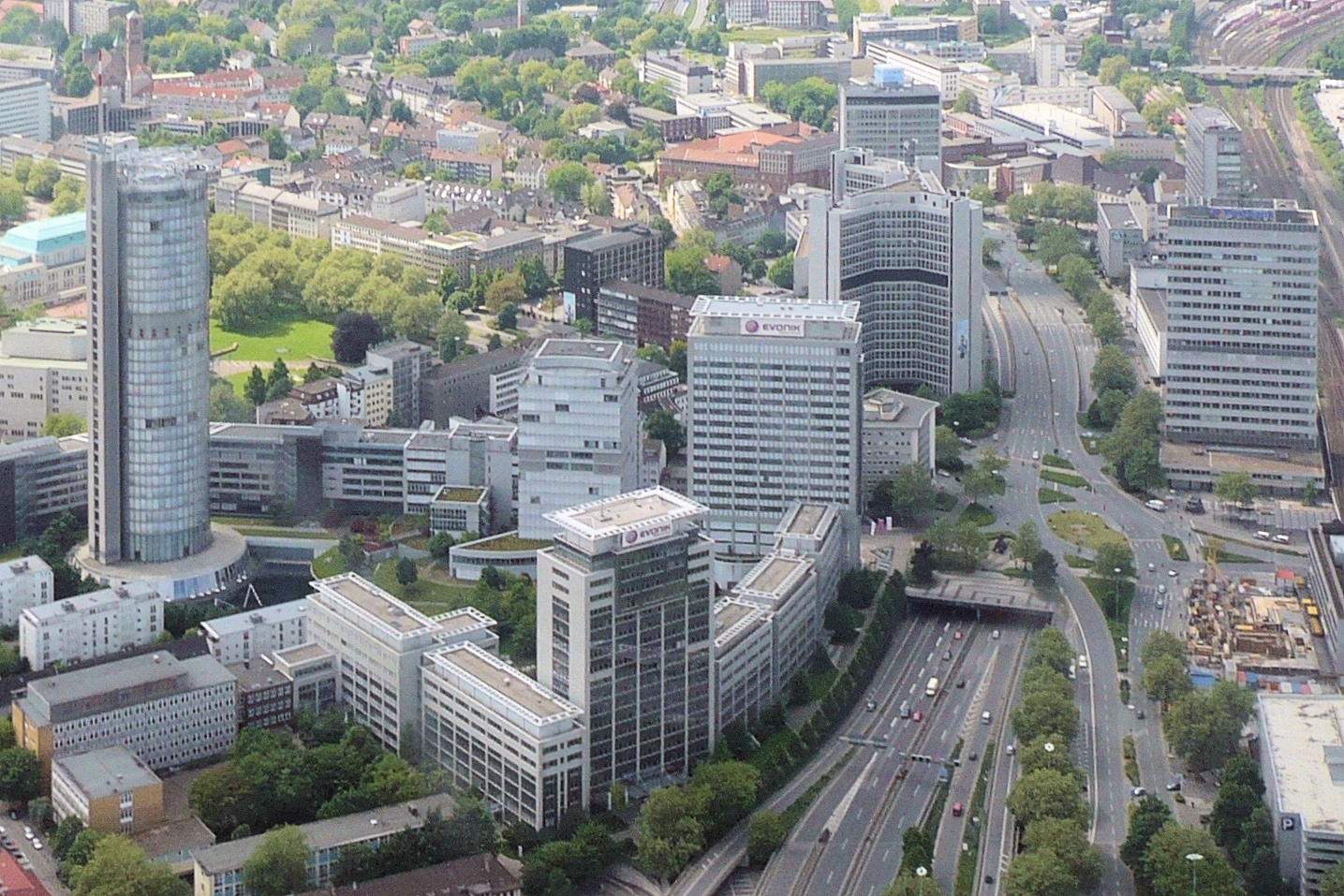
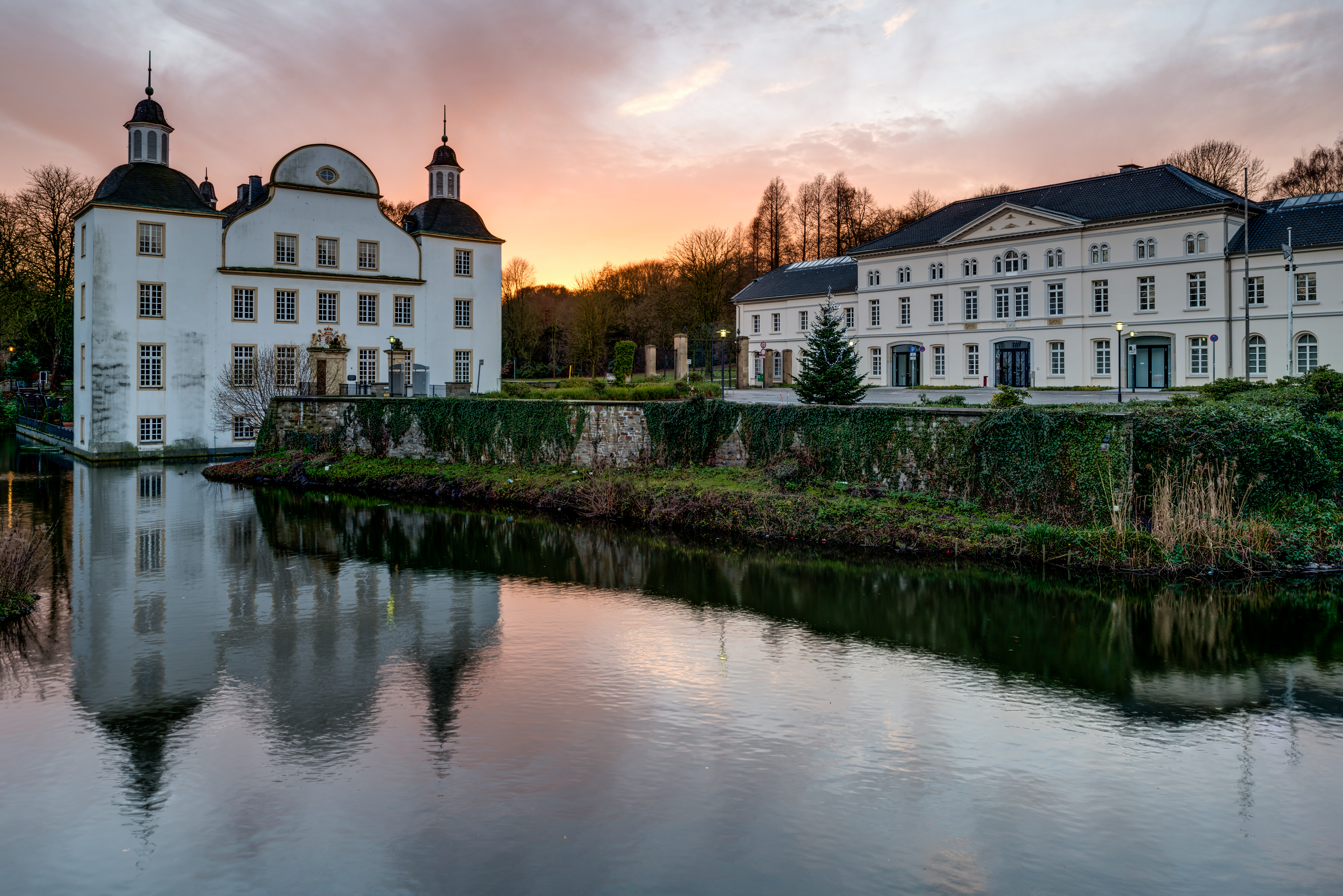
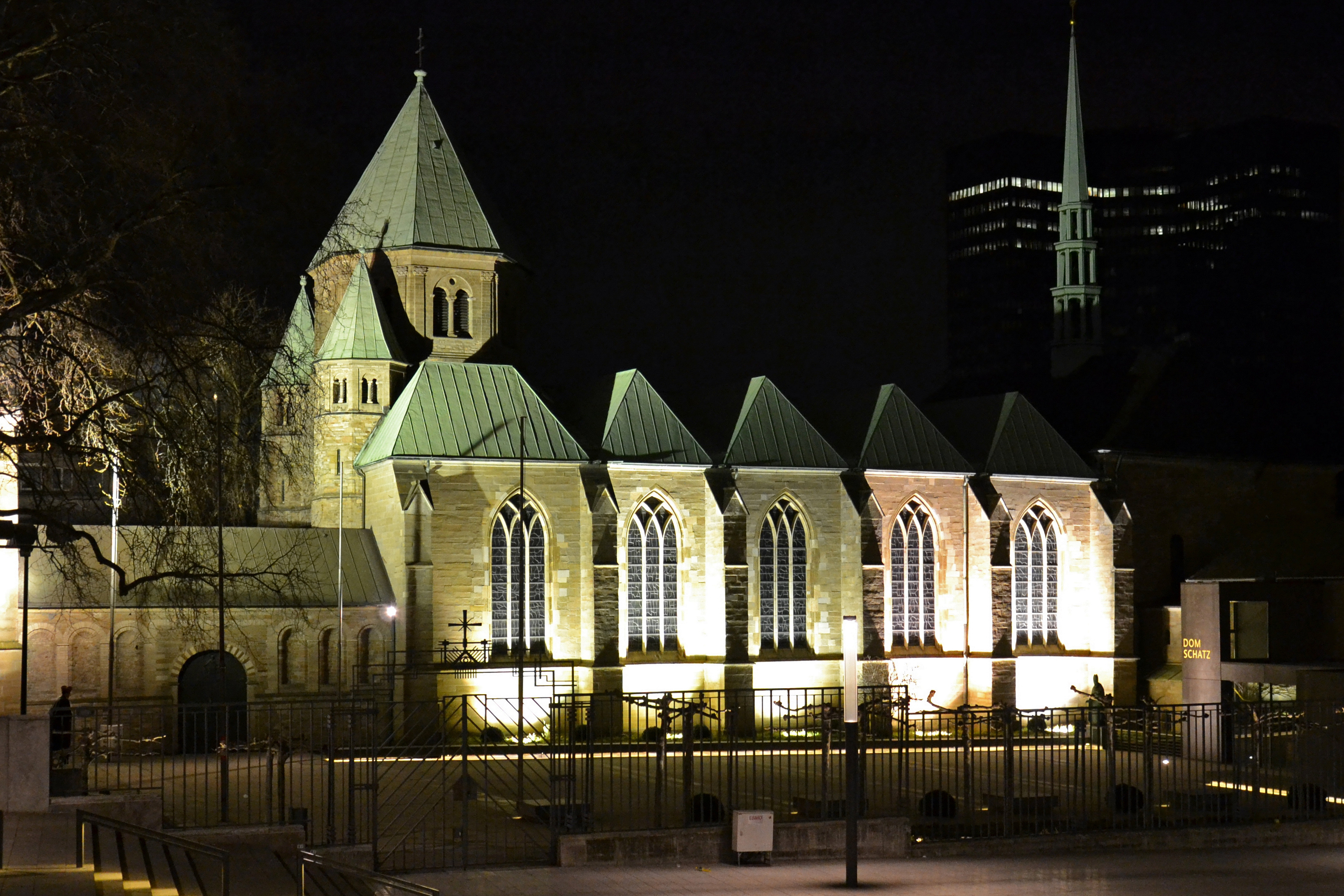
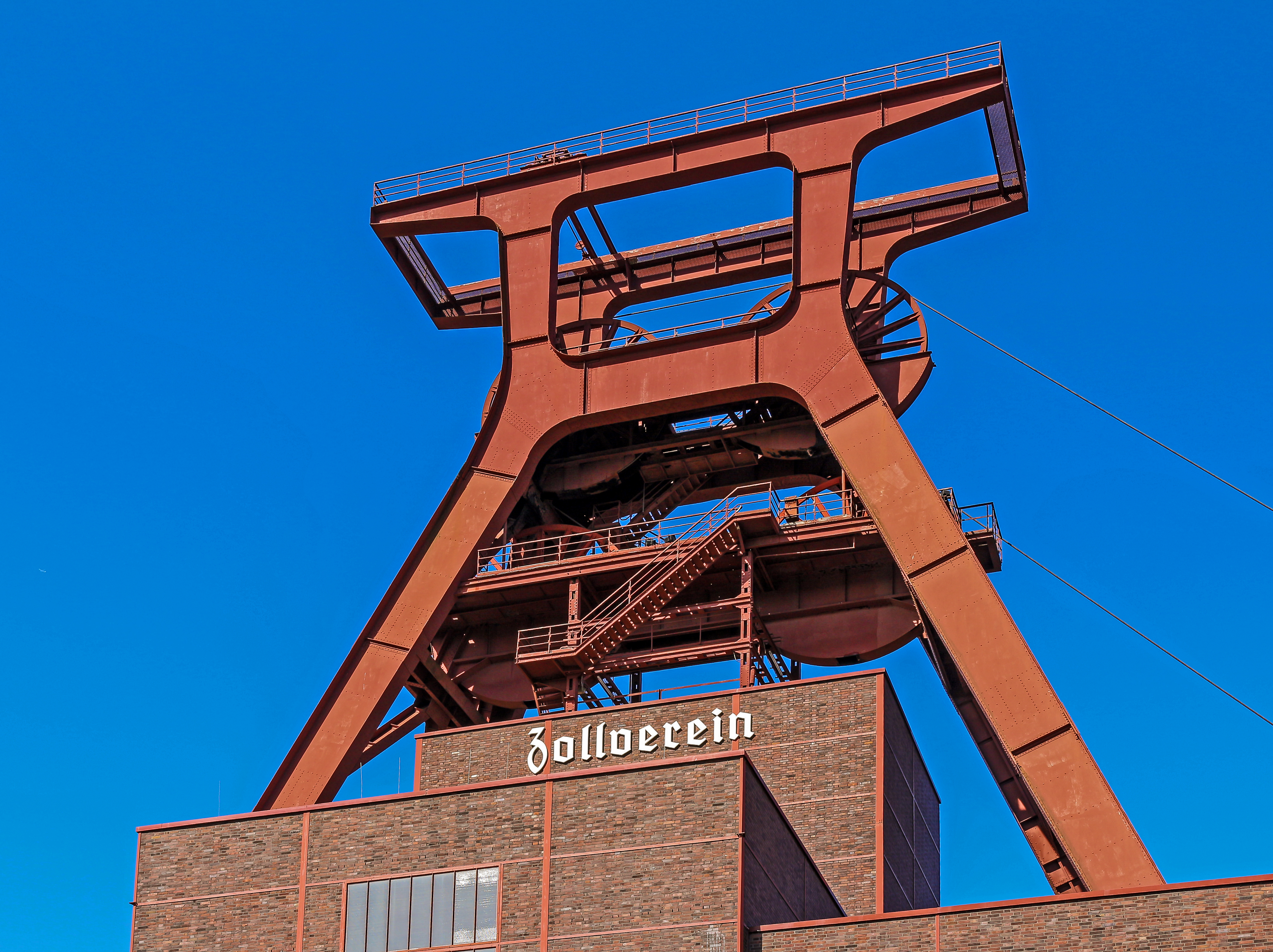
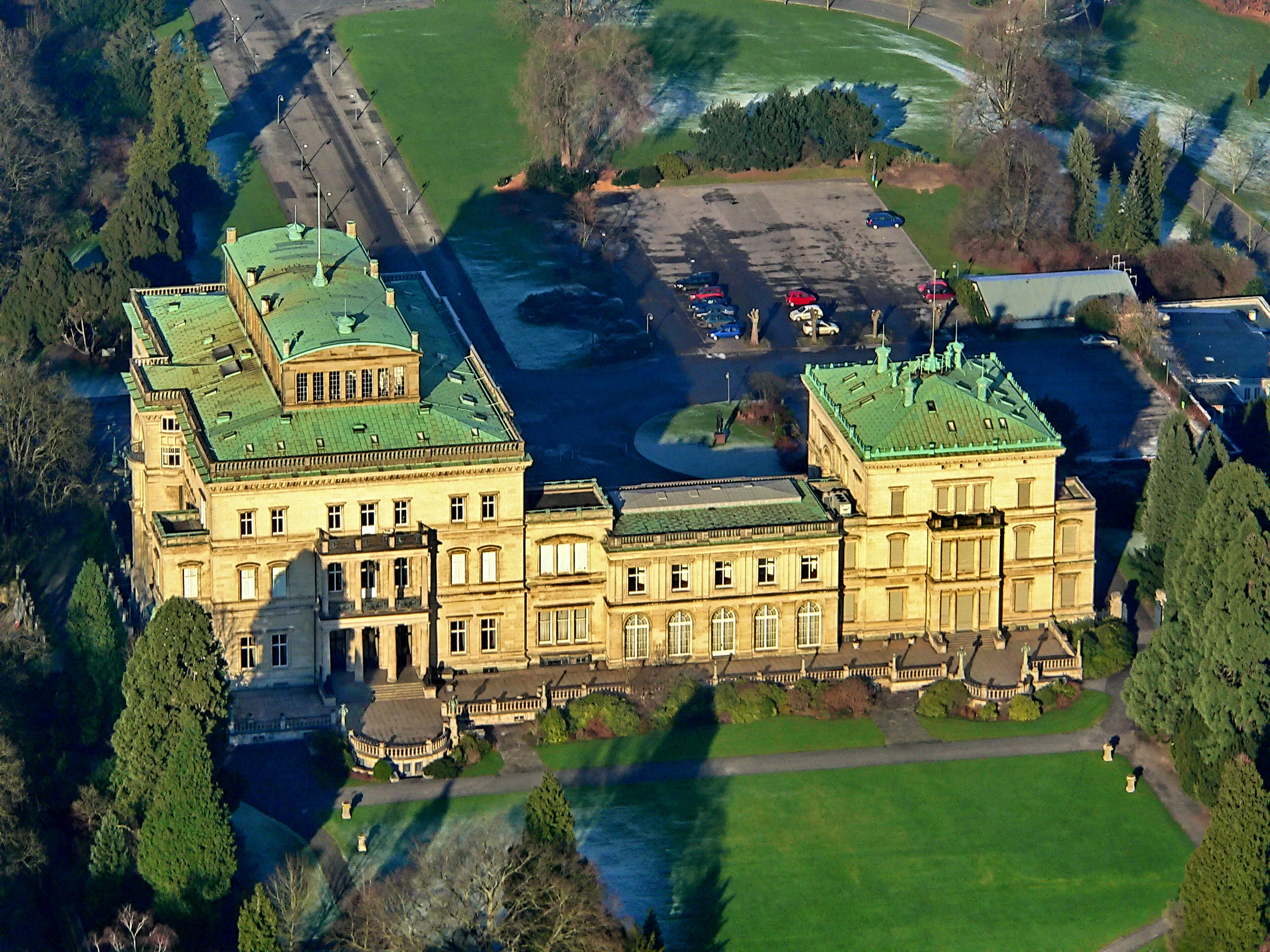
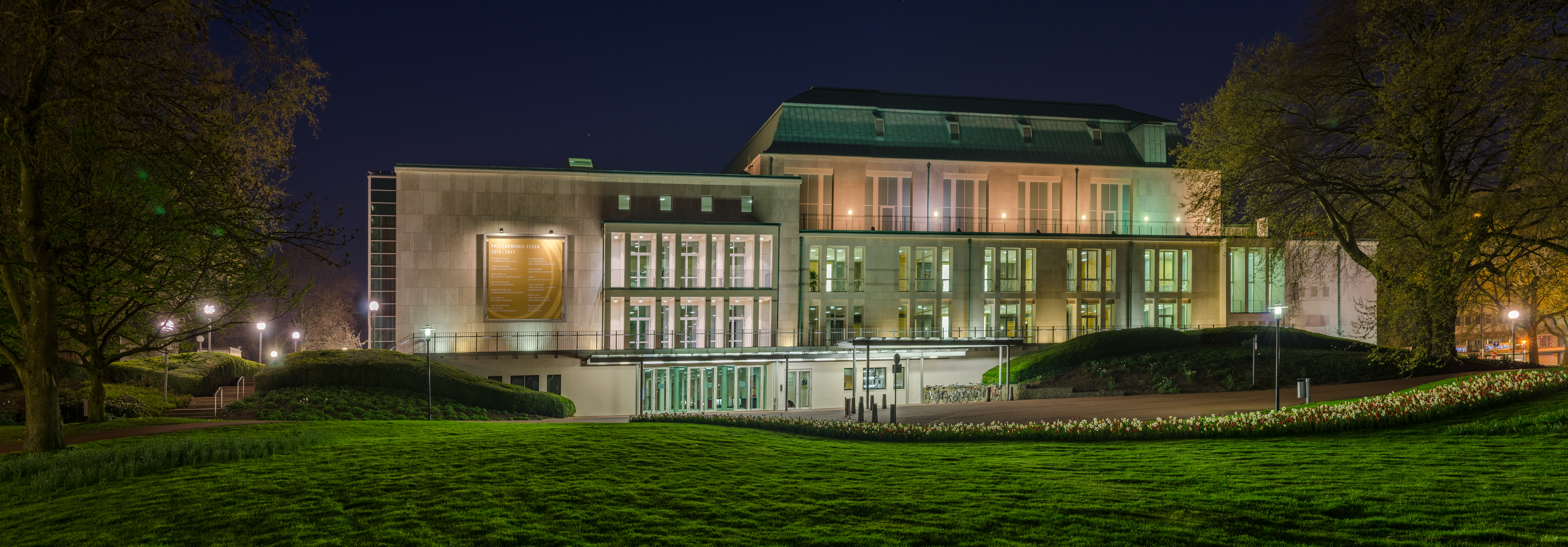
- Skyline of the city ThyssenKrupp Headquarters Essen Business District Borbeck Castle Essen Minster Zollverein Villa Hügel Saalbau Essen

- Flag Coat of arms
- Interactive map of Essen
- Location within Germany Location within North Rhine-Westphalia
- Coordinates: 51°27′3″N 7°0′47″E
- Country: Germany
- State: North Rhine-Westphalia
- Admin. region: Düsseldorf
- District: Urban district
- Subdivisions: 9 districts, 50 boroughs

Government
  - Mayor (2025–30): Thomas Kufen (CDU)
  - Governing parties: CDU/ SPD

Area
  - Total: 210.34 km^{2} (81.21 sq mi)
- Elevation: 116 m (381 ft)

Population (2025-12-31)
  - Total: 573,618
  - Density: 2,727.1/km^{2} (7,063.2/sq mi)
- Time zone: UTC+01:00 (CET)
  - Summer (DST): UTC+02:00 (CEST)
- Postal codes: 45001–45359
- Dialling codes: 0201, 02054 (Kettwig)
- Vehicle registration: E
- Website: www.essen.de

Logo of the city of Essen

Essen (German: [ˈɛsn̩]) is the central and, after Dortmund, second-largest city of the Ruhr, the largest urban area in Germany. Its population of 573,618 makes it the fourth-largest city of North Rhine-Westphalia after Cologne, Düsseldorf and Dortmund, as well as the tenth-largest city of Germany. Essen lies in the larger Rhine-Ruhr metropolitan region, second largest by GDP in the EU, and is part of the cultural area of Rhineland. Due to its central location in the Ruhr, Essen is often regarded as the Ruhr's "secret capital".

Two rivers flow through the city: the Emscher in the north, and the Ruhr River in the south, which is dammed in Essen to form the Lake Baldeney and Lake Kettwig reservoirs. The central and northern boroughs of Essen historically belong to the Low German Westphalian dialects area, and the south of the city to the Low Franconian Bergish area.

Essen is seat to several of the region's authorities, as well as to eight of the 100 largest publicly held German corporations by revenue, including four DAX-listed corporations. Essen is often considered the energy capital of Germany with E.ON and RWE, Germany's largest energy providers, both headquartered in the city.

Essen is also known for its impact on the arts through the Folkwang University of the Arts, its Zollverein School of Management and Design, and the Red Dot industrial product design award. In early 2003, the universities of Essen and the nearby city of Duisburg were merged into the University of Duisburg-Essen with campuses in both cities and a university hospital in Essen. In 1958, Essen was chosen as the seat of the Roman Catholic Diocese of Essen, often referred to as the diocese of the Ruhr (Ruhrbistum).

Founded around 845, Essen remained a small town within the sphere of influence of an important ecclesiastical principality, Essen Abbey, until the onset of industrialization. The city then—especially through the Krupp family's iron works—became one of Germany's most important coal and steel centres. Essen, until the 1970s, attracted workers from all over the country; it was the fifth-largest city in Germany between 1929 and 1988, peaking at over 730,000 inhabitants in 1962. Following the region-wide decline of heavy industries in the last decades of the 20th century, the city has seen the development of a strong tertiary sector of the economy. The most notable witness of this structural change (Strukturwandel) is the Zollverein Coal Mine Industrial Complex, which had once been the largest of its kind in Europe. Ultimately closed in 1993, both the coking plant and the mine have been listed by UNESCO as a World Heritage Site since 2001.

Notable accomplishments of the city in recent years include the title of European Capital of Culture on behalf of the whole Ruhr area in 2010 and being selected as the European Green Capital for 2017.

== Geography ==
=== General ===
Oberhausen

Bottrop

Gladbeck

Gelsenkirchen

Mülheim an der Ruhr

Map of the Districts and Boroughs of Essen

Essen
(map of districts and boroughs)

Bochum

Ratingen

Heiligenhaus

Velbert

Hattingen

Essen is located in the centre of the Ruhr area, one of the largest urban areas in Europe comprising eleven independent cities and four districts with some 5.3 million inhabitants into a megalopolis. The city limits of Essen itself are 87 kilometres (54 mi) long, and border ten cities – five belonging to a district (kreisangehörig) and five independent – with a total population of approximately 1.4 million. The city extends over 21 kilometres (13 mi) from north to south and 17 kilometres (11 mi) from west to east, mainly north of the River Ruhr.

The Ruhr forms the Lake Baldeney reservoir in the boroughs of Fischlaken, Kupferdreh, Heisingen and Werden. The lake, a popular recreational area, dates from 1931 to 1933, when some thousands of unemployed coal miners dredged it with primitive tools. Generally, large areas south of the River Ruhr (including the suburbs of Schuir and Kettwig) are quite green and are often quoted as examples of rural structures in the otherwise relatively densely populated central Ruhr area. According to the Federal Statistical Office of Germany, Essen with 9.2% of its area covered by recreational green is the greenest city in North Rhine-Westphalia and the third-greenest city in Germany. The city has been shortlisted for the title of European Green Capital two consecutive times, for 2016 and 2017, winning for 2017. The city was singled out for its exemplary practices in protecting and enhancing nature and biodiversity and efforts to reduce water consumption. Essen participates in a variety of networks and initiatives to reduce greenhouse gas emissions and improve the city's resilience in the face of climate change.

The lowest point can be found in the northern borough of Karnap at 26.5 metres (86.9 ft), the highest point in the borough of Heidhausen at 202.5 metres (664 ft). The average elevation is 116 metres (381 ft).

=== City districts ===
Essen comprises fifty boroughs which in turn are grouped into nine suburban districts (called Stadtbezirke) often named after the most important boroughs. Each Stadtbezirk is assigned a Roman numeral and has a local body of nineteen members with limited authority. Most of the boroughs were originally independent municipalities but were gradually annexed from 1901 to 1975. This long-lasting process of annexation has led to a strong identification of the population with "their" boroughs or districts and to a rare peculiarity: the borough of Kettwig, located south of the Ruhr River, and which was not annexed until 1975, has its own area code and remains part of the Archdiocese of Cologne, whereas all other boroughs of Essen and some neighbouring cities constitute the Diocese of Essen.

=== Climate ===
Essen has a typical oceanic climate (Köppen: Cfb; Trewartha: Dobk) with cool winters and warm summers (different from Berlin or Stuttgart). Without large mountains and the presence of inland seas, it ends up extending a predominantly marine climate is found in Essen, usually a little more extreme and drier in other continents in such geographical location. Its average annual temperature is 10 °C (50 °F): 13.3 °C (56 °F) during the day and 6.7 °C (44 °F) at night. The average annual precipitation is 934 millimetres (37 in). The coldest month of the year is January, when the average temperature is 2.4 °C (36 °F). The warmest months are July and August, with an average temperature of 18 °C (64 °F).

The Essen weather station has recorded the following extreme values:

- Highest Temperature 40.0 °C (104.0 °F) on 25 July 2019.
- Warmest Minimum 24.4 °C (75.9 °F) on 1 August 1943.
- Coldest Maximum −13.8 °C (7.2 °F) on 1 February 1956.
- Lowest Temperature −24.0 °C (−11.2 °F) on 27 January 1942.
- Highest Daily Precipitation 109.8 mm (4.32 in) on 14 August 1954.
- Wettest Month 235.0 mm (9.25 in) in August 1938.
- Wettest Year 1,372.1 mm (54.02 in) in 2023.
- Driest Year 573.0 mm (22.56 in) in 1959.
- Earliest Snowfall: 4 November 1966.
- Latest Snowfall: 28 April 1985.
- Longest annual sunshine: 2,058.8 hours in 2022.
- Shortest annual sunshine: 1,192.5 hours in 1962.

Climate data for Essen-Bredeney: 161m, 1991−2020 normals, extremes 1935–present
Month	Jan	Feb	Mar	Apr	May	Jun	Jul	Aug	Sep	Oct	Nov	Dec	Year
Record high °C (°F)	16.2 (61.2)	19.5 (67.1)	24.5 (76.1)	28.9 (84.0)	32.0 (89.6)	34.5 (94.1)	40.0 (104.0)	36.6 (97.9)	32.7 (90.9)	26.4 (79.5)	20.2 (68.4)	16.8 (62.2)	40.0 (104.0)
Mean maximum °C (°F)	11.9 (53.4)	13.0 (55.4)	18.0 (64.4)	23.0 (73.4)	26.4 (79.5)	30.1 (86.2)	32.0 (89.6)	31.3 (88.3)	26.3 (79.3)	21.2 (70.2)	15.9 (60.6)	12.2 (54.0)	33.7 (92.7)
Mean daily maximum °C (°F)	5.1 (41.2)	6.1 (43.0)	10.0 (50.0)	14.5 (58.1)	18.2 (64.8)	21.1 (70.0)	23.5 (74.3)	23.0 (73.4)	19.0 (66.2)	14.2 (57.6)	9.1 (48.4)	5.7 (42.3)	14.1 (57.4)
Daily mean °C (°F)	2.9 (37.2)	3.4 (38.1)	6.4 (43.5)	10.2 (50.4)	13.8 (56.8)	16.6 (61.9)	18.7 (65.7)	18.4 (65.1)	14.9 (58.8)	10.8 (51.4)	6.7 (44.1)	3.7 (38.7)	10.5 (50.9)
Mean daily minimum °C (°F)	0.6 (33.1)	0.8 (33.4)	3.1 (37.6)	5.9 (42.6)	9.2 (48.6)	12.0 (53.6)	14.3 (57.7)	14.2 (57.6)	11.3 (52.3)	7.9 (46.2)	4.3 (39.7)	1.6 (34.9)	7.1 (44.8)
Mean minimum °C (°F)	−6.9 (19.6)	−5.6 (21.9)	−2.9 (26.8)	−0.3 (31.5)	3.1 (37.6)	6.9 (44.4)	9.7 (49.5)	9.2 (48.6)	6.5 (43.7)	1.5 (34.7)	−1.7 (28.9)	−5.3 (22.5)	−9.0 (15.8)
Record low °C (°F)	−24.0 (−11.2)	−18.2 (−0.8)	−11.1 (12.0)	−4.6 (23.7)	−1.8 (28.8)	1.0 (33.8)	4.4 (39.9)	6.0 (42.8)	0.7 (33.3)	−4.7 (23.5)	−7.8 (18.0)	−16.7 (1.9)	−24.0 (−11.2)
Average precipitation mm (inches)	84.8 (3.34)	66.7 (2.63)	65.6 (2.58)	52.5 (2.07)	67.0 (2.64)	79.1 (3.11)	85.6 (3.37)	92.2 (3.63)	74.0 (2.91)	77.3 (3.04)	79.4 (3.13)	94.0 (3.70)	925.3 (36.43)
Average extreme snow depth cm (inches)	4.4 (1.7)	4.0 (1.6)	1.6 (0.6)	trace	0 (0)	0 (0)	0 (0)	0 (0)	0 (0)	0 (0)	1.6 (0.6)	3.6 (1.4)	8.4 (3.3)
Average precipitation days (≥ 0.1 mm)	18.6	16.1	16.4	13.3	14.3	14.5	15.2	15.3	14.8	16.3	18.6	19.9	193.1
Average relative humidity (%)	84.0	80.5	74.8	68.8	69.4	71.3	70.7	71.4	77.5	81.9	85.3	86.1	76.8
Mean monthly sunshine hours	55.4	72.8	125.9	172.9	204.7	197.7	208.2	193.0	149.7	109.7	60.6	45.1	1,593.7
Source 1: NOAA
Source 2: DWD Open Data

Climate data for Essen-Bredeney: 161m, 1961–1990 normals
Month	Jan	Feb	Mar	Apr	May	Jun	Jul	Aug	Sep	Oct	Nov	Dec	Year
Mean daily maximum °C (°F)	3.9 (39.0)	5.1 (41.2)	8.3 (46.9)	12.4 (54.3)	17.1 (62.8)	20.0 (68.0)	21.6 (70.9)	21.6 (70.9)	18.4 (65.1)	14.0 (57.2)	8.1 (46.6)	4.9 (40.8)	12.9 (55.2)
Daily mean °C (°F)	1.9 (35.4)	2.5 (36.5)	5.1 (41.2)	8.5 (47.3)	12.9 (55.2)	15.7 (60.3)	17.4 (63.3)	17.2 (63.0)	14.4 (57.9)	10.4 (50.7)	5.7 (42.3)	2.9 (37.2)	9.6 (49.3)
Mean daily minimum °C (°F)	−0.3 (31.5)	0.0 (32.0)	2.2 (36.0)	4.8 (40.6)	8.7 (47.7)	11.5 (52.7)	13.2 (55.8)	13.3 (55.9)	11.1 (52.0)	7.9 (46.2)	3.5 (38.3)	0.9 (33.6)	6.4 (43.5)
Average precipitation mm (inches)	81 (3.2)	57 (2.2)	75 (3.0)	68 (2.7)	73 (2.9)	97 (3.8)	89 (3.5)	77 (3.0)	73 (2.9)	70 (2.8)	83 (3.3)	90 (3.5)	933 (36.7)
Average precipitation days (≥ 1.0 mm)	14	10	13	12	12	12	11	10	11	10	14	14	143
Mean monthly sunshine hours	44.5	76.2	102.6	147.0	192.6	181.6	186.0	183.1	134.5	111.1	55.7	38.8	1,453.7
Source: NOAA

== History ==
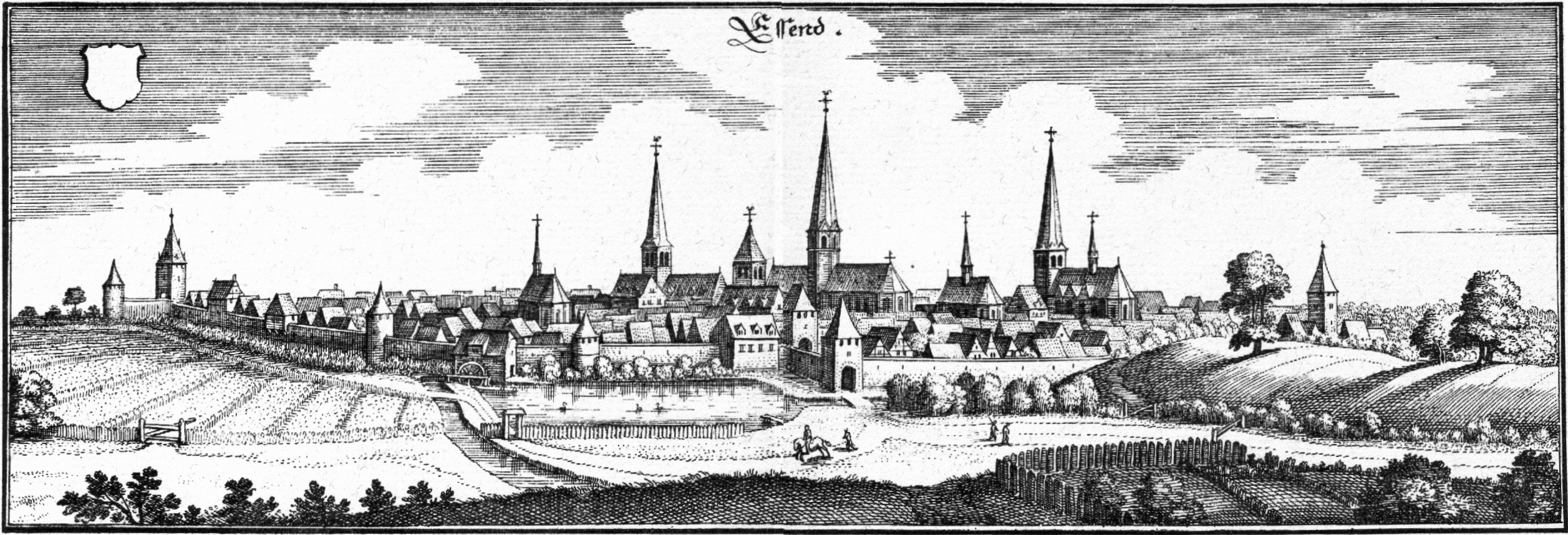
Essen on an engraving from 1647

=== Origin of the name ===
In German-speaking countries, the name of the city Essen often causes confusion as to its origins, because it has the same form as the German infinitive of the verb for "eating" (written as lowercase essen), and/or the German noun for food (which is always capitalized as Essen, adding to the confusion). Although scholars still dispute the interpretation of the name, there remain a few noteworthy interpretations. The oldest known form of the city's name is Astnide, which changed to Essen by way of forms such as Astnidum, Assinde, Essendia and Esnede. The name Astnide may have referred either to a region where many ash trees were found or to a region in the east (of the Frankish Empire).

=== Early history ===
The oldest archaeological find, the Vogelheimer Klinge, dates back to 280,000 – 250,000 BCE. It is a blade found in the borough of Vogelheim in the northern part of the city during the construction of the Rhine–Herne Canal in 1926. Other artifacts from the Stone Age have also been found, although these are not overly numerous. Land utilization was very high—especially due to mining activities during the Industrial Age—and any more major finds, especially from the Mesolithic era, are not expected. Finds from 3,000 BCE and onwards are far more common, the most important one being a Megalithic tomb found in 1937. Simply called Chest of Stone (Steinkiste), it is referred to as "Essen's earliest preserved example of architecture".

Essen was part of the settlement areas of several Germanic peoples (Chatti, Bructeri, Marsi), although a clear distinction among these groupings is difficult.

The Alteburg castle in the south of Essen dates back to the eighth century, the nearby Herrenburg to the ninth century.

Recent research into Ptolemy's Geographia has identified the polis or oppidum Navalia as Essen.

=== Eighth–twelfth centuries ===
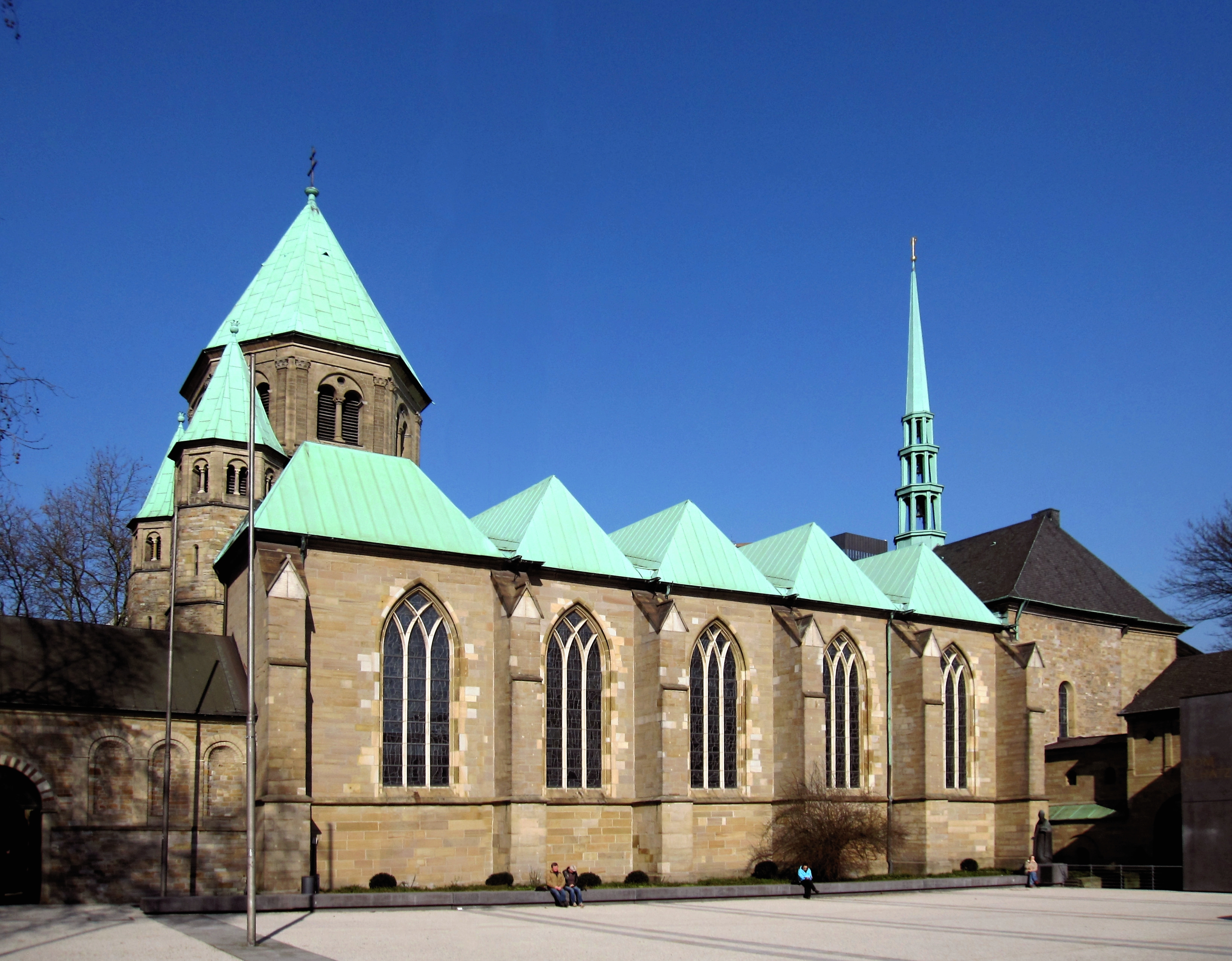
Essen Minster

Around 845, Saint Altfrid (around 800–874), the later Bishop of Hildesheim, founded an abbey for women (coenobium Astnide) in the centre of present-day Essen. The first abbess was Altfrid's relative Gerswit (see also: Essen Abbey). In 799, Saint Liudger had already founded Benedictine Werden Abbey on its own grounds a few kilometres south. The region was sparsely populated with only a few smallholdings and an old and probably abandoned castle. Whereas Werden Abbey sought to support Liudger's missionary work in the Harz region (Helmstedt/Halberstadt), Essen Abbey was meant to care for women of the higher Saxon nobility. This abbey was not an abbey in the ordinary sense, but rather intended as a residence and educational institution for the daughters and widows of the higher nobility; led by an abbess, the members other than the abbess herself were not obliged to take vows of chastity.

Around 852, construction of the collegiate church of the abbey began, to be completed in 870. A major fire in 946 heavily damaged both the church and the settlement. The church was rebuilt, expanded considerably, and is the foundation of the present Essen Cathedral.

The first documented mention of Essen dates back to 898, when Zwentibold, King of Lotharingia, willed territory on the western bank of the River Rhine to the abbey. Another document, describing the foundation of the abbey and allegedly dating back to 870, is now considered an 11th-century forgery.

In 971, Mathilde II, granddaughter of Emperor Otto I, took charge of the abbey. She was to become the most important of all abbesses in the history of Essen. She reigned for over 40 years, and endowed the abbey's treasury with invaluable objects such as the oldest preserved seven branched candelabrum, and the Golden Madonna of Essen, the oldest known sculpture of the Virgin Mary in the western world. Mathilde was succeeded by other women related to the Ottonian emperors: Sophia, daughter of Otto II and sister of Otto III, and Teophanu, granddaughter of Otto II. It was under the reign of Teophanu that Essen, which had been called a city since 1003, received the right to hold markets in 1041. Ten years later, Teophanu had the eastern part of Essen Abbey constructed. Its crypt contains the tombs of St. Altfrid, Mathilde II, and Teophanu herself.

=== 13th–17th centuries ===
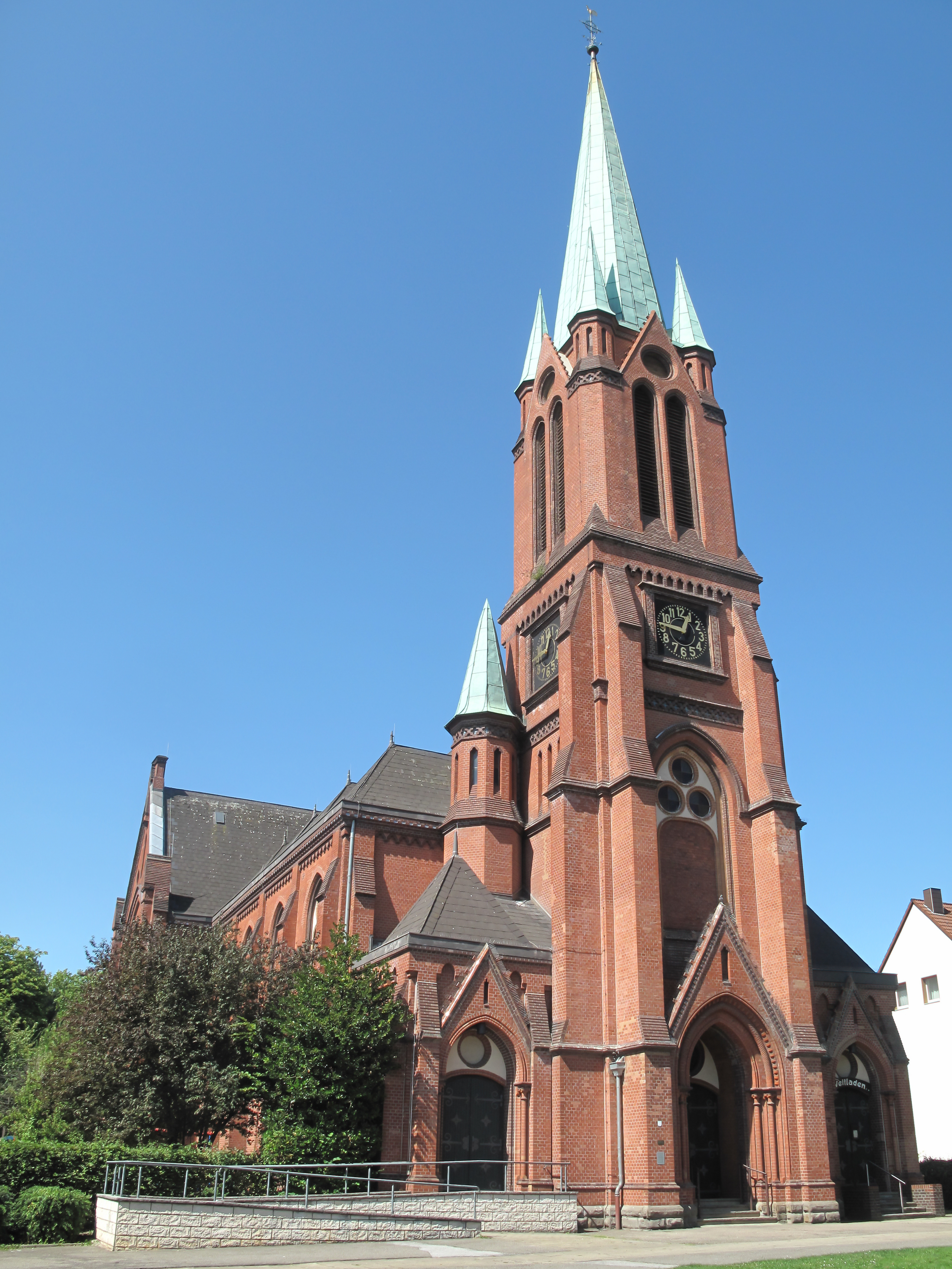
Old Church (Alte Kirche) in Altenessen, built 1887

In 1216, the abbey, which had only been an important landowner until then, gained the status of a princely residence when Emperor Frederick II called abbess Elisabeth I "Princess of the Empire" (Reichsfürstin) in an official letter. In 1244, 28 years later, Essen received its town charter and seal when Konrad von Hochstaden, the Archbishop of Cologne, marched into the city and erected a city wall together with the population. This proved a temporary emancipation of the population of the city from the princess-abbesses, but this lasted only until 1290. That year, King Rudolph I restored the princess-abbesses to full sovereignty over the city, much to the dismay of the population of the growing city, who called for self-administration and imperial immediacy. The title free imperial city was finally granted by Emperor Charles IV in 1377. However, in 1372, Charles had paradoxically endorsed Rudolph I's 1290 decision and hence left both the abbey and the city in imperial favour. Disputes between the city and the abbey about supremacy over the region remained common until the abbey's dissolution in 1803. Many lawsuits were filed at the Reichskammergericht, one of them lasting almost 200 years. The final decision of the court in 1670 was that the city had to be "duly obedient in dos and don'ts" to the abbesses but could maintain its old rights—a decision that did not really solve any of the problems.

In 1563, the city council, with its self-conception as the only legitimate ruler of Essen, introduced the Protestant Reformation. The Catholic abbey had no troops to counter this development.

=== Thirty Years' War ===
During the Thirty Years' War, the Protestant city and the Catholic abbey opposed each other. In 1623, princess-abbess Maria Clara von Spaur, Pflaum und Valör, managed to direct Catholic Spaniards against the city in order to initiate a Counter-Reformation. In 1624, a "re-Catholicization" law was enacted, and churchgoing was strictly controlled. In 1628, the city council filed against this at the Reichskammergericht. Maria had to flee to Cologne when the Dutch stormed the city in 1629. She returned in the summer of 1631 following the Bavarians under Gottfried Heinrich Graf zu Pappenheim, only to leave again in September. She died 1644 in Cologne.

The war proved a severe blow to the city, with frequent arrests, kidnapping and rape. Even after the Peace of Westphalia from 1648, troops remained in the city until 9 September 1650.

=== Industrialization ===
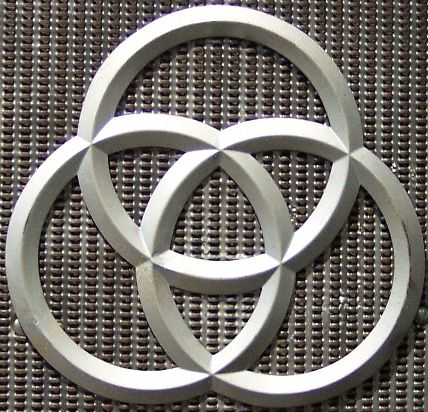
Three rings of the Krupp logo

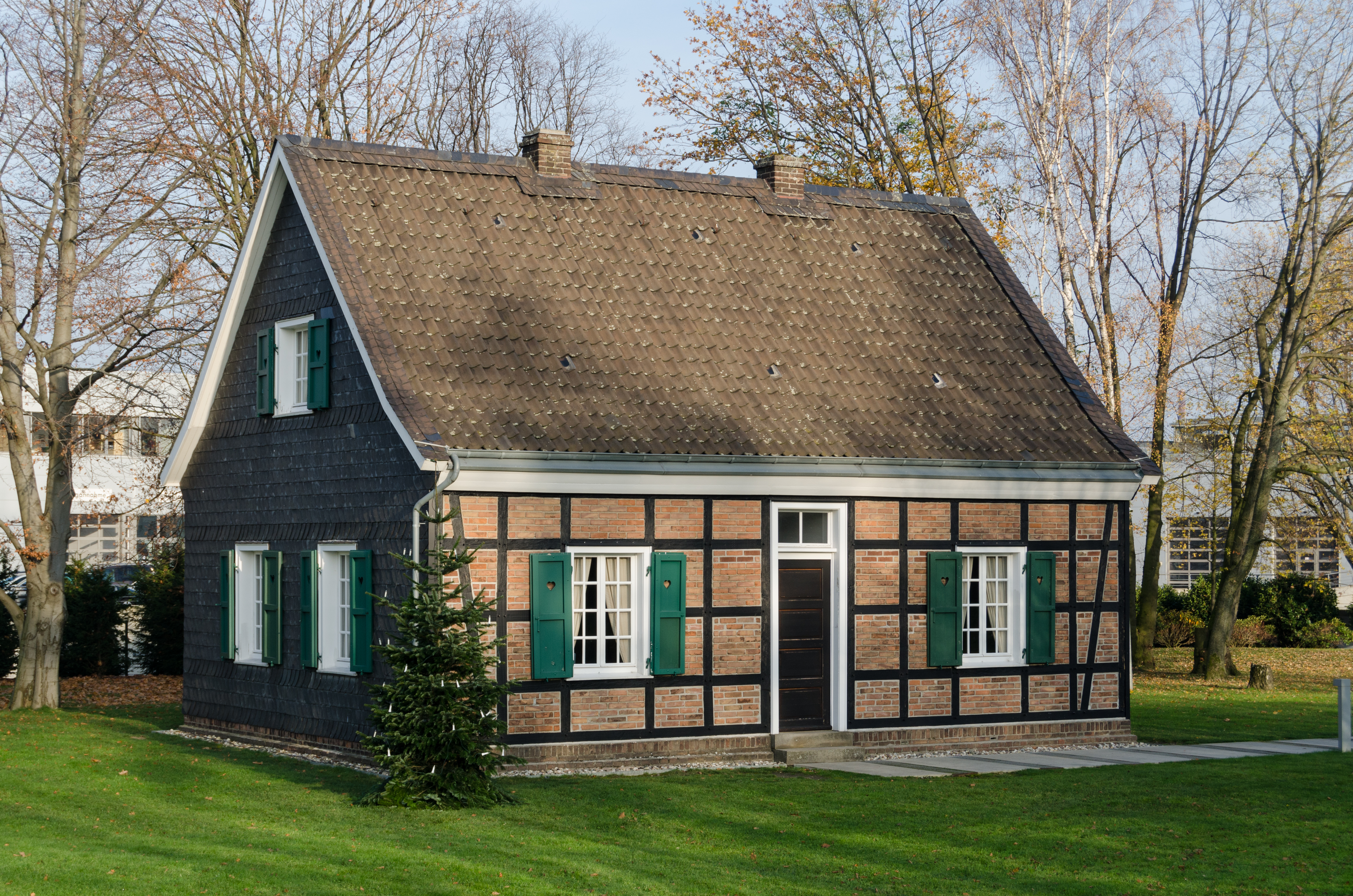
The historic house of the Krupp family in 2014

The first historic evidence of the important mining tradition of Essen date back to the 14th century, when the princess-abbess was granted mining rights. The first silver mine opened in 1354, but the indisputably more important coal was not mentioned until 1371, and coal mining only began in 1450.

At the end of the 16th century, many coal mines had opened in Essen, and the city earned a name as a centre of the weapons industry. Around 1570, gunsmiths made high profits and in 1620, they produced 14,000 rifles and pistols a year. The city became increasingly important strategically.

Resident in Essen since the 16th century, the Krupp family dynasty and Essen shaped each other. In 1811, Friedrich Krupp founded Germany's first cast-steel factory in Essen and laid the cornerstone for what was to be the largest enterprise in Europe for a couple of decades. The weapon factories in Essen became so important that a sign facing the main railway station welcomed visitors Hitler and Mussolini to the "Armory of the Reich" (Waffenschmiede des Reiches) in 1937. The Krupp Works also were the main reason for the large population growth beginning in the mid-19th century. Essen reached a population of 100,000 in 1896. Other industrialists, such as Friedrich Grillo, who in 1892 donated the Grillo-Theater to the city, also played a major role in the shaping of the city and the Ruhr area in the late 19th and early 20th century. The main competitor of Krupp in the Ruhr area was Thyssen & Company, later the Thyssen AG. In 1999 the Krupp and Thyssen steel works merged to form ThyssenKrupp with a headquarter in Essen.

=== World War I and occupation ===
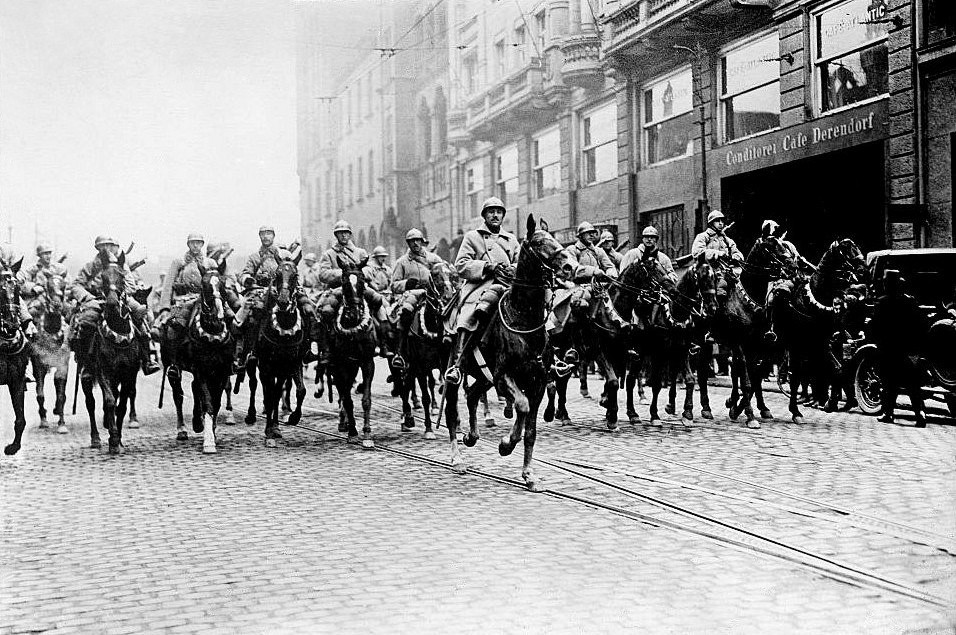
French troops enter Essen in 1923.

Riots broke out in February 1917 following a breakdown in the supply of flour. There were then strikes in the Krupp factory.

On 11 January 1923 the Occupation of the Ruhr was carried out by the invasion of French and Belgian troops into the Ruhr. The French Prime Minister, Raymond Poincaré, was convinced that Germany failed to comply the demands of the Treaty of Versailles. On the morning of 31 March 1923, the culmination of this French-German confrontation occurred when a small French military command, occupied the Krupp car hall to seize several vehicles. This event caused 13 deaths and 28 injured. The occupation of the Ruhr ended in summer 1925.

=== Nazism, World War II ===
On 28 May 1936, Adolf Hitler made a speech at the Krupp steelworks in Essen, with thousands of workers in attendance.

On the night of Kristallnacht on 10 November 1938, the synagogue was sacked, but remained through the whole war in the exterior almost intact. The Steele synagogue was completely destroyed.

During the Nazi era, tens of thousands of slave labourers were forced to work in 350 Essen forced labour camps. Here, they did mining work and worked for companies like Krupp and Siemens. Alfried Krupp was convicted in the Krupp trial at Nuremberg for his role in this but was pardoned by the US in 1951. There were several subcamps in Essen in the Second World War, such as the subcamps Humboldtstraße, Gelsenberg, Schwarze Poth.

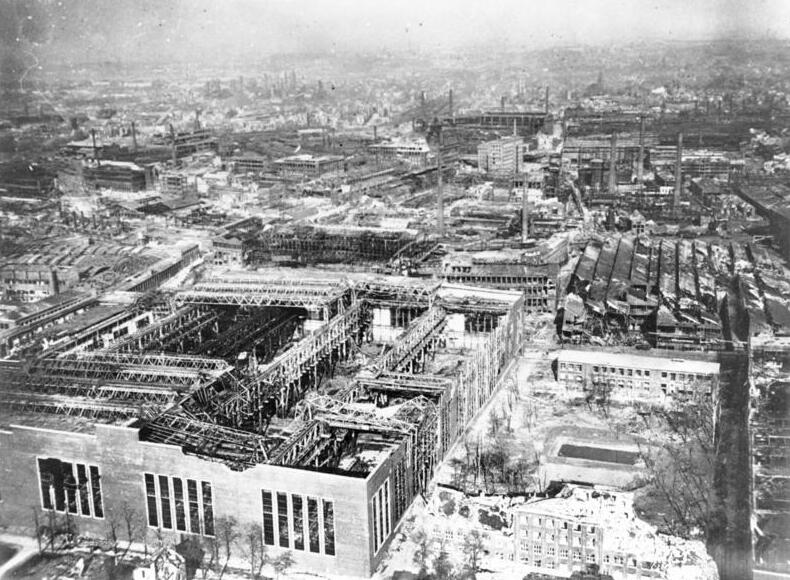
Devastation of Krupp factory

As a major industrial centre, Essen was a target for allied bombing, the Royal Air Force (RAF) dropping a total of 37,014 tonnes (82 million pounds) of bombs on the city. Over 270 air raids were launched against the city, destroying 90% of the centre and 60% of the suburbs. On 5 March 1943 Essen was subjected to one of the heaviest air-raids of the war. 461 people were killed, 1,593 injured and a further 50,000 residents of Essen were made homeless. On 13 December 1944 three British airmen were lynched. On 8 March 1946, a German army officer and a civilian were hanged for this crime.

The Krupp decoy site (Kruppsche Nachtscheinanlage) was built in Velbert to divert Allied airstrikes from the actual production site of the arms factory in Essen.

The Allied ground advance into Germany reached Essen in April 1945. The US 507th Parachute Infantry Regiment of the 17th Airborne Division, acting as regular infantry and not in a parachute role, entered the city unopposed and captured it on 10 April 1945.

After the occupation of Germany by the allies, Essen was assigned to the British Zone of Occupation.

=== Twenty-first century ===
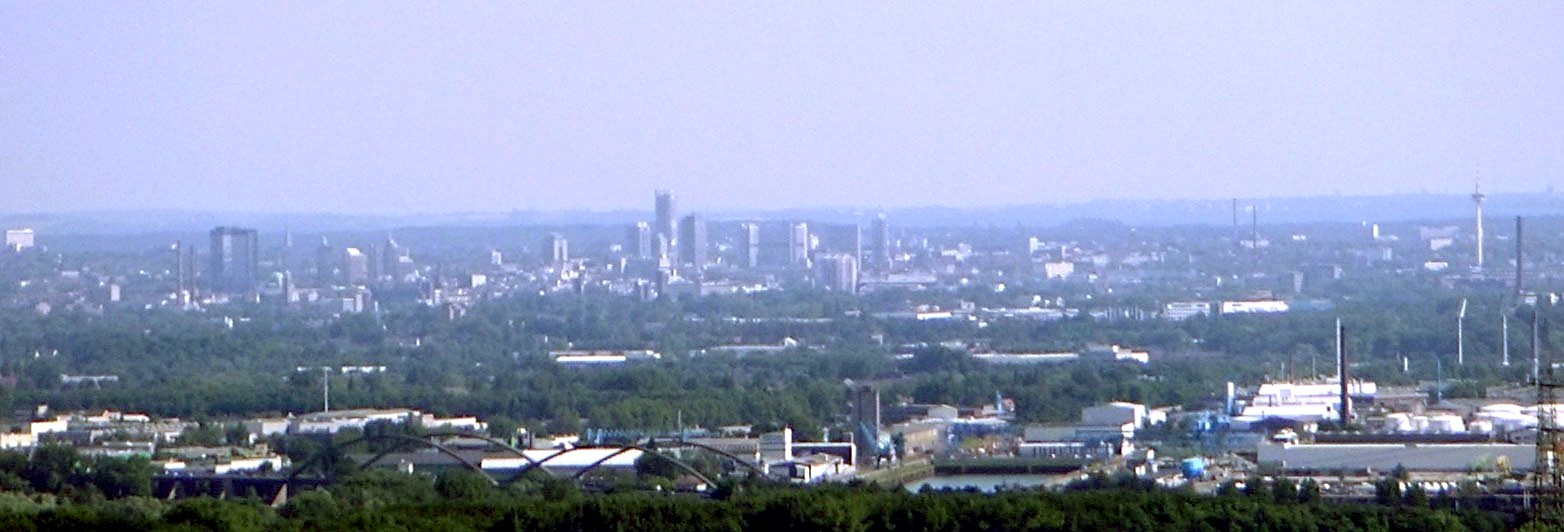
View over central Essen from Bottrop

Although weaponry is no longer produced in Essen, old industrial enterprises such as ThyssenKrupp and RWE remain large employers in the city. Foundations such as the Alfried Krupp von Bohlen und Halbach-Stiftung still promote the well-being of the city, for example by supporting a hospital and donating €55 million for a new building for the Museum Folkwang, one of the Ruhr area's major art museums.

== Politics ==
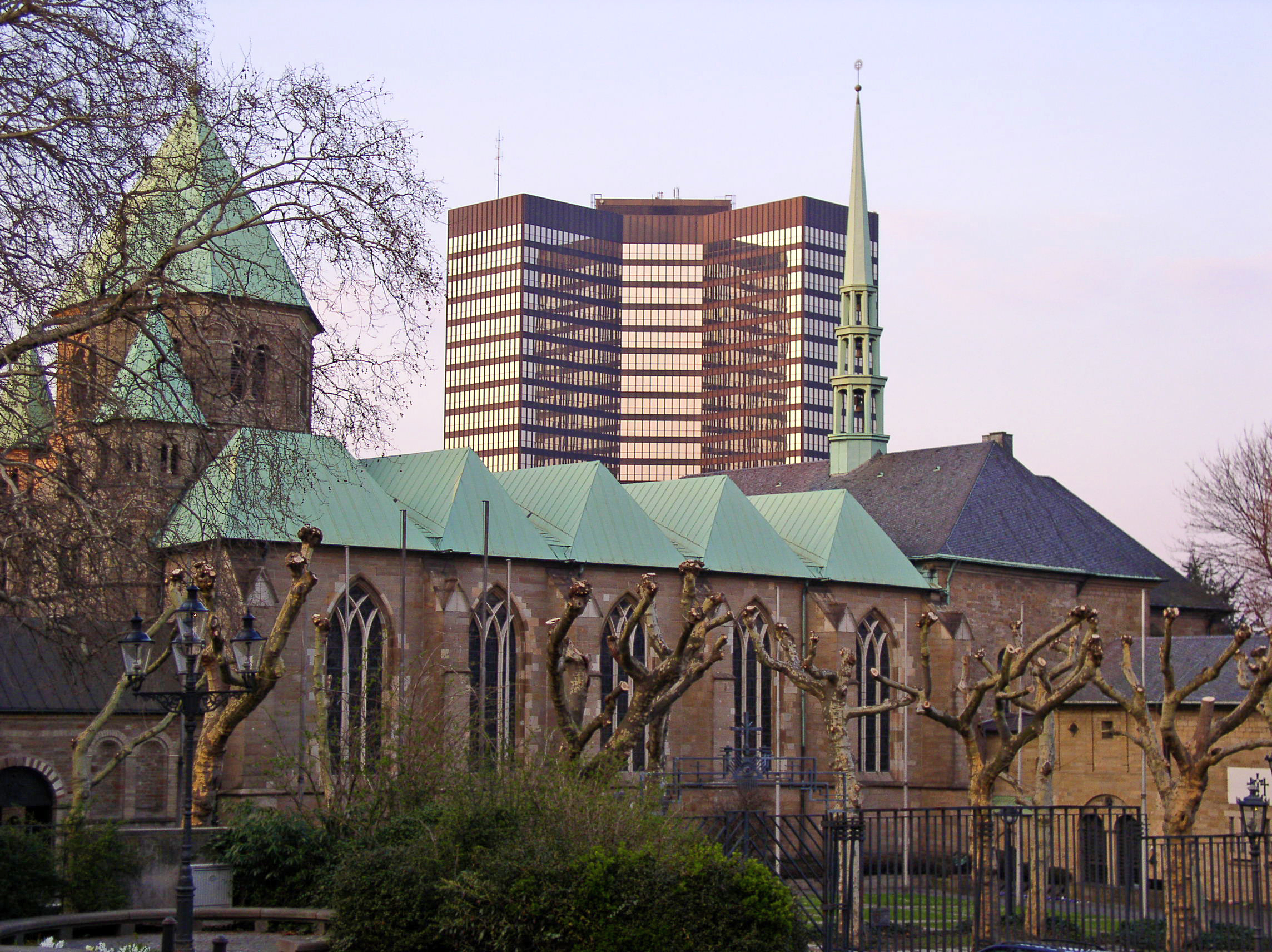
Old and new government seats: Essen Cathedral (front) and the city hall (background)

=== Historical development ===
The administration of Essen had for a long time been in the hands of the princess-abbesses as heads of the Imperial Abbey of Essen. However, from the 14th century onwards, the city council increasingly grew in importance. In 1335, it started choosing two burgomasters, one of whom was placed in charge of the treasury. In 1377, Essen was granted imperial immediacy but had to abandon this privilege later on. Between the early 15th and 20th centuries, the political system of Essen underwent several changes, most importantly the introduction of the Protestant Reformation in 1563, the annexation of 1802 by Prussia, and the subsequent secularization of the principality in 1803. The territory was made part of the Prussian Province of Jülich-Cleves-Berg from 1815 to 1822, after which it became part of the Prussian Rhine Province until its dissolution in 1946.

During the German Revolution of 1918–19, Essen was the home of the Essen Tendency (Essener Richtung) within the Communist Workers' Party of Germany. In 1922 they founded the Communist Workers' International. Essen became one of the centres of resistance to Social Democracy and the Freikorps alike.

During the Nazi era (1933–1945), mayors were installed by the Nazi Party. After World War II, the military government of the British occupation zone installed a new mayor and a municipal constitution modelled on that of British cities. Later, the city council was again elected by the population. The mayor was elected by the council as its head and as the city's main representative. The administration was led by a full-time Oberstadtdirektor. In 1999, the position of Oberstadtdirektor was abolished in North Rhine-Westphalia and the mayor became both main representative and administrative head. In addition, the population now elects the mayor directly.

=== Mayor ===
Results of the second round of the 2025 mayoral election

The current mayor of Essen is Thomas Kufen of the Christian Democratic Union (CDU), who was elected in 2015 and re-elected in 2020 and 2025.

The most recent mayoral election was held on 14 September 2025 with a runoff election being held on 28 September, and the results were as follows:

Candidate	Party	First round		Second round	
Candidate	Party	Votes	%	Votes	%
Thomas Kufen	Christian Democratic Union	100,789	42.3	89,649	57.1
Julia Klewin	Social Democratic Party	48,090	20.2	67,427	43.0
Andreas Lojewski	Alternative for Germany	37,671	15.8		
Inga Marie Sponheuer	Alliance 90/The Greens	21,470	9.0		
Liesa Schulz	The Left	11,730	4.9		
Jörg Heribert Küpperfahrenberg	Essen Citizens' Alliance-Free Voters Essen	8,385	3.5		
Mike Rohleder	Die PARTEI	6,571	2.8		
Heiko Uwe Johannes Jürgen Müller	Free Democratic Party	3,501	1.5		
Valid votes		238,207	99.4	157,076	98.8
Invalid votes		1,425	0.6	1,893	1.2
Total		239,632	100.0	158,969	100.0
Electorate/voter turnout		431,774	55.5	431,565	36.8
Source: City of Essen

=== City council ===
Results of the 2025 city council election

The Essen city council governs the city alongside the mayor. The current coalition in the council is between the SPD and the CDU. The most recent city council election was held on 14 September 2025, and the results were as follows:

Party	Votes	%	+/-	Seats	+/-
Christian Democratic Union (CDU)	71,848	30.2	▼4.2	25	▼5
Social Democratic Party (SPD)	53,847	22.7	▼1.6	19	▼2
Alternative for Germany (AfD)	40,217	17.0	▲9.5	14	▲8
Alliance 90/The Greens (Grüne)	29,339	12.3	▼6.3	10	▼6
The Left (Die Linke)	13,898	5.8	▲1.9	5	▲2
Essen Citizens' Alliance-Free Voters Essen (FBB-FW)	6,624	2.8	▼0.1	2	▼1
Free Democratic Party (FDP)	4,584	1.9	▼1.1	2	▼1
Die PARTEI (PARTEI)	4,337	1.8	▼0.7	1	▼1
Sahra Wagenknecht Alliance (BSW)	3,681	1.6	New	1	New
Volt Germany (Volt)	3,587	1.5	▲1.3	1	▲1
Human Environment Animal Protection (Tierschutz)	3,012	1.3	▼0.8	1	▼1
LICHT Essen (LICHT)	1,930	0.8	New	1	New
Independent Gollan	740	0.3	New	0	New
German Communist Party (DKP)	140	0.1	▼0.1	0	±0
Valid votes	237,784	99.3			
Invalid votes	1,730	0.7			
Total	239,514	100.0		82	▼4
Electorate/voter turnout	431,774	55.5	▲7.3		
Source: City of Essen

=== Coat of arms ===
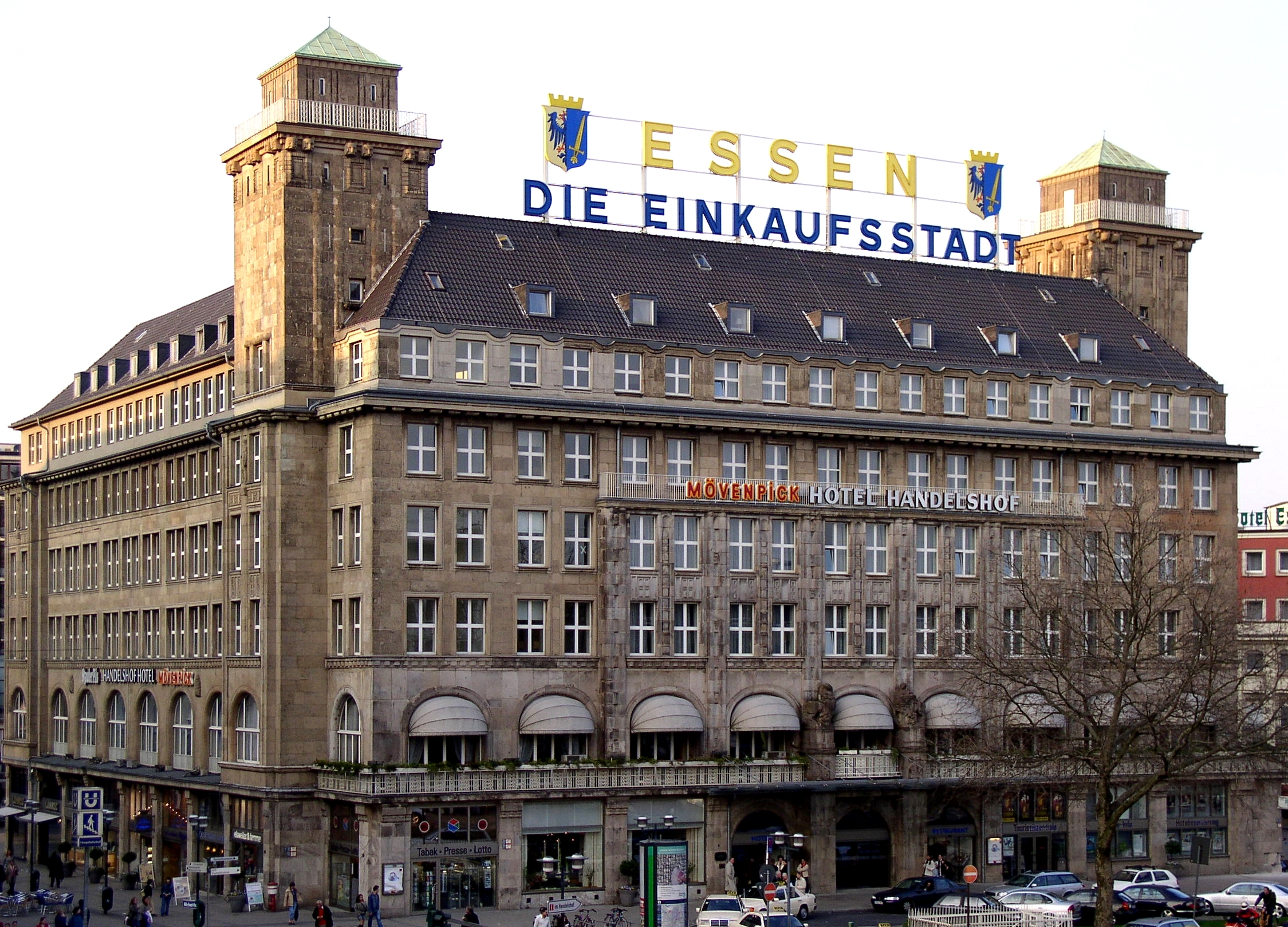
Hotel Handelshof with modified coat of arms and former unofficial motto

Essen's coat of arms

The coat of arms of the city of Essen is a heraldic peculiarity. Granted in 1886, it is a so-called arms of alliance (Allianzwappen) and consists of two separate shields under a single crown. Most other coats of arms of cities use a mural crown instead of a heraldic crown. The crown, however, does not refer to the city of Essen itself, but instead to the secularized ecclesiastical principality of Essen under the reign of the princess-abbesses. The dexter (heraldically right) escutcheon shows the double-headed Imperial Eagle of the Holy Roman Empire, granted to the city in 1623. The sinister (heraldically left) escutcheon is one of the oldest emblems of Essen and shows a sword that people believed was used to behead the city's patron Saints Cosmas and Damian. People tend to connect the sword in the left shield with one found in the cathedral treasury. This sword, however, is much more recent. A slightly modified and more heraldically correct version of the coat of arms can be found on the roof of the Handelshof hotel near the main station.

== Demographics ==
Historical population

Year	Pop.	±% p.a.
1816	4,721	—
1831	5,460	+0.97%
1849	8,813	+2.70%
1871	51,513	+8.36%
1895	96,128	+2.63%
1905	231,360	+9.18%
1919	439,257	+4.69%
1925	470,524	+1.15%
1933	654,461	+4.21%
1939	666,743	+0.31%
1950	605,411	−0.87%
1956	698,925	+2.42%
1965	745,846	+0.72%

Year	Pop.	±% p.a.
1970	713,235	−0.89%
1975	677,570	−1.02%
1980	647,645	−0.90%
1985	619,993	−0.87%
1990	626,973	+0.22%
1995	614,861	−0.39%
2000	595,243	−0.65%
2005	585,430	−0.33%
2010	574,635	−0.37%
2015	582,624	+0.28%
2020	582,415	−0.01%
2025	573,618	−0.30%

Population size may be affected by changes in administrative divisions. Source: Landesdatabank Nordrhein-Westfalen (1965-2025)

Essen has a population of 573,618 and is the 2nd largest city in Ruhr area after Dortmund and the 10th largest city in Germany. Essen has also the largest urban density with cities such as Bochum, Gelsenkirchen and Oberhausen borders this city. In 1965, the population reached its historical peak of over 745,000 (Essen was the fifth largest German city at that time) due to its booming industrial era of the Ruhr Area and the West German Wirtschaftswunder. Since 1970s, the population of Essen declined due to loss of jobs by coal and mining. Essen has a large migrant population, most of them are from Turkey, Syria and Poland.

== International relations ==
The City of Monessen, Pennsylvania, situated along the Monongahela River, was named after the river and Essen.

=== Twin towns – sister cities ===
Essen is twinned with:

- Changzhou, China (2015)
- Grenoble, France (1974)
- Nizhny Novgorod, Russia (1991)
- Sunderland, England, United Kingdom (1949)
- Tampere, Finland (1960)
- Tel Aviv, Israel (1991)
- Zabrze, Poland (2015)

=== Cooperation agreements ===
Essen cooperates with:

- Kōriyama, Japan (2017)
- Qingdao, China (2008)
- Rivne, Ukraine (2022)
- Ulaanbaatar, Mongolia (2012)

== Industry and infrastructure ==
=== Economy ===
Essen is home to several large companies, among them the ThyssenKrupp industrial conglomerate which is also registered in Duisburg and originates from a 1999 merger between Duisburg-based Thyssen AG and Essen-based Friedrich Krupp AG Hoesch-Krupp. The largest company registered only in Essen is Germany's second-largest electric utility RWE AG. Essen hosts parts of the corporate headquarters of Schenker AG, the logistics division of Deutsche Bahn. Other major companies include Germany's largest construction company Hochtief, as well as Aldi Nord, Evonik Industries, Karstadt, Medion AG and Deichmann, Europe's largest shoe retailer. The Coca-Cola Company had originally established their German headquarters in Essen (around 1930), where it remained until 2003, when it was moved to the capital Berlin. In light of the Energy transition in Germany, Germany's largest electric utility E.ON announced that, after restructuring and splitting off its conventional electricity generation division (coal, gas, atomic energy), it will move its headquarters to Essen in 2016, becoming a sole provider of renewable energy. The DAX-listed chemical distribution company Brenntag announced it would move its headquarters to Essen at the end of 2017.

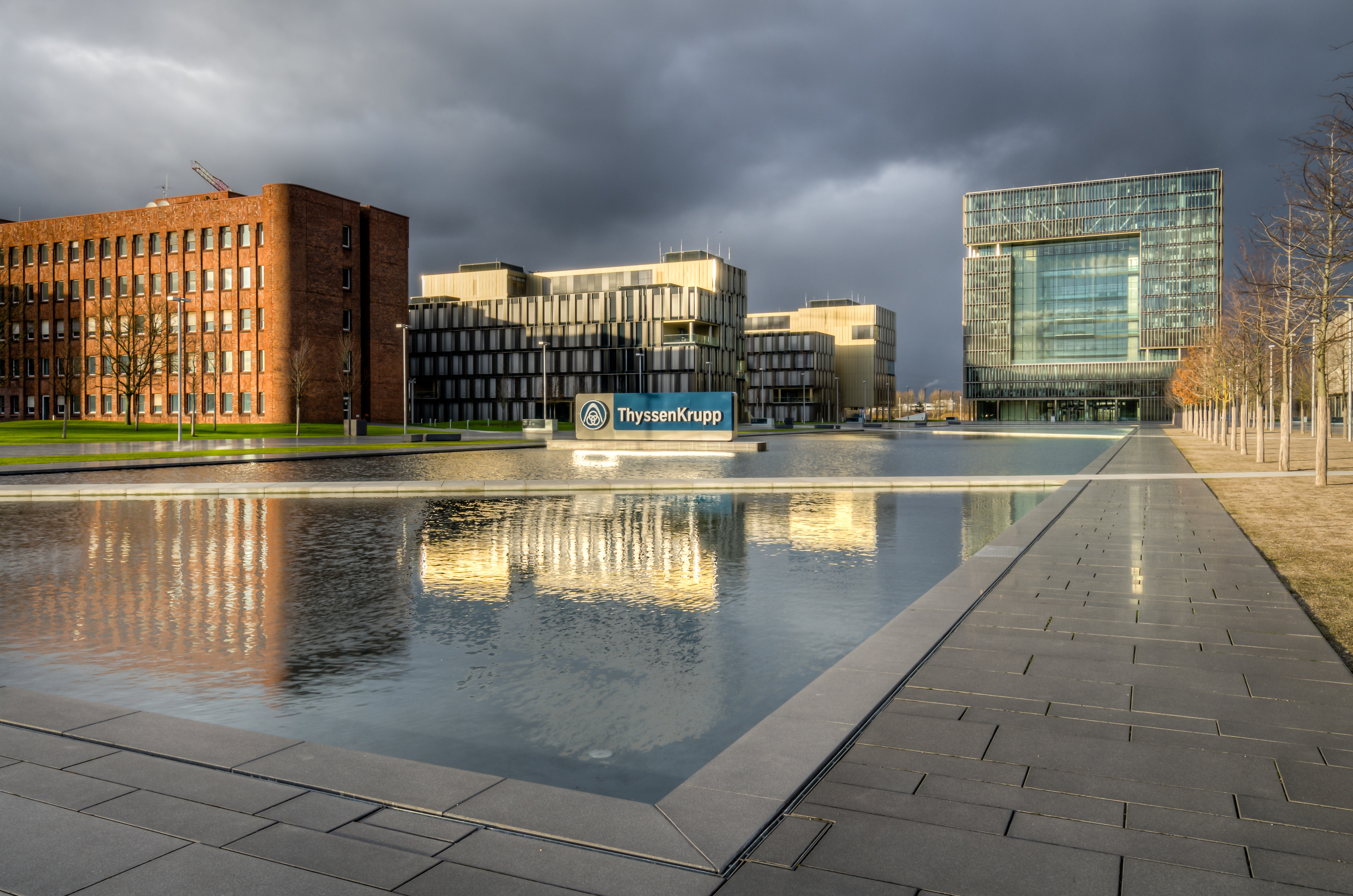
ThyssenKrupp headquarters in Essen

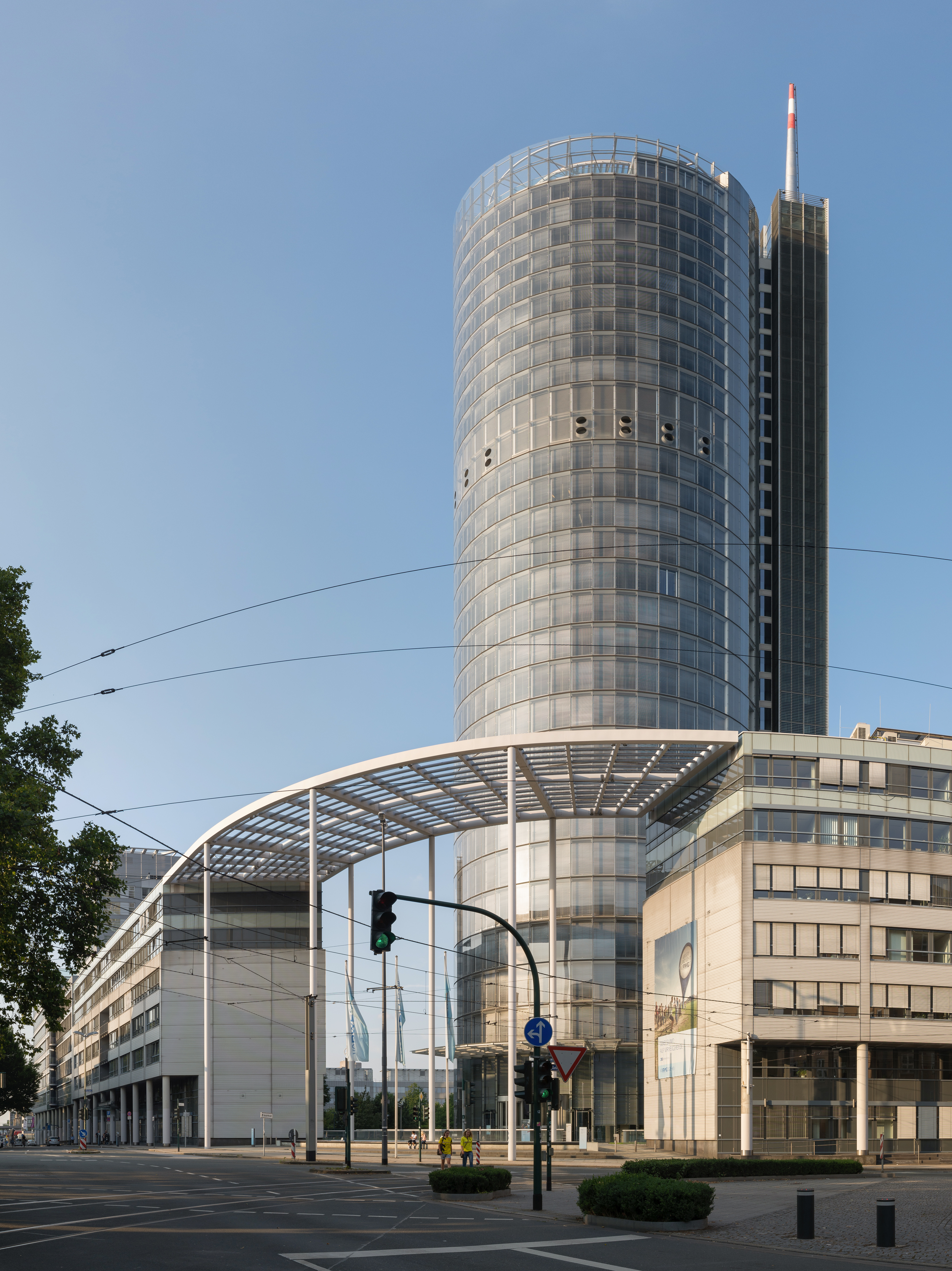
RWE AG headquarters in the business district

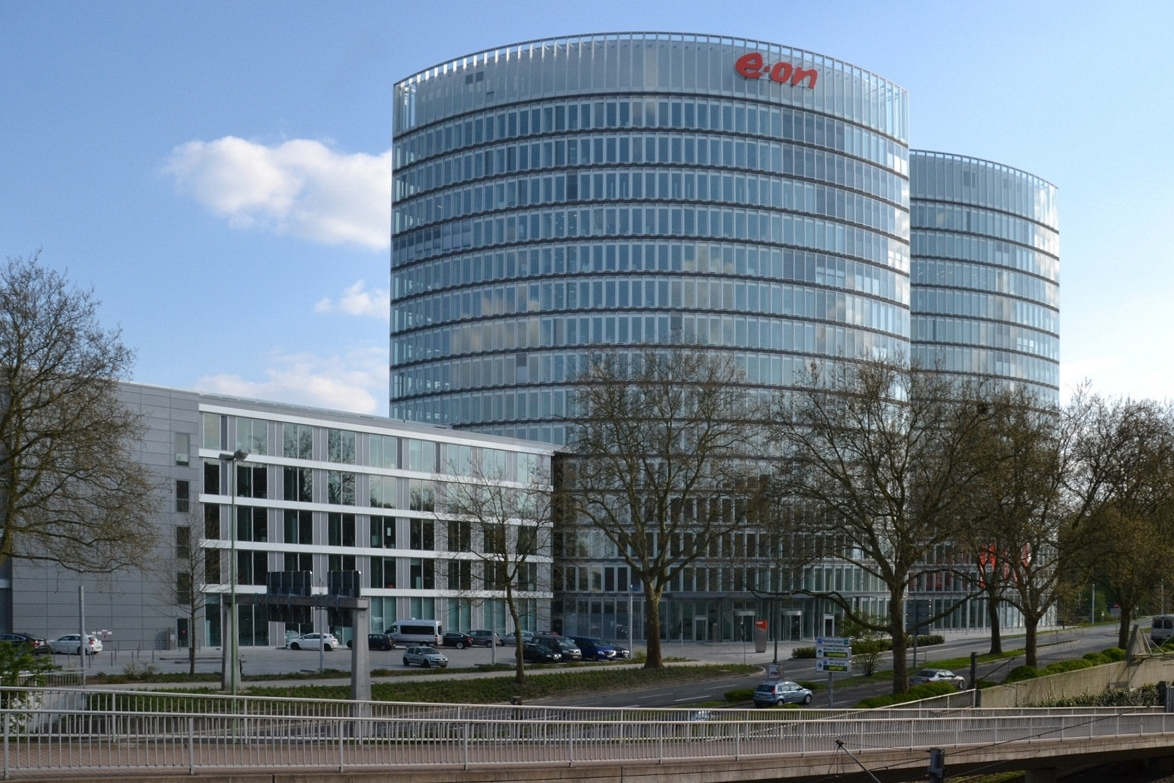
E.ON headquarters

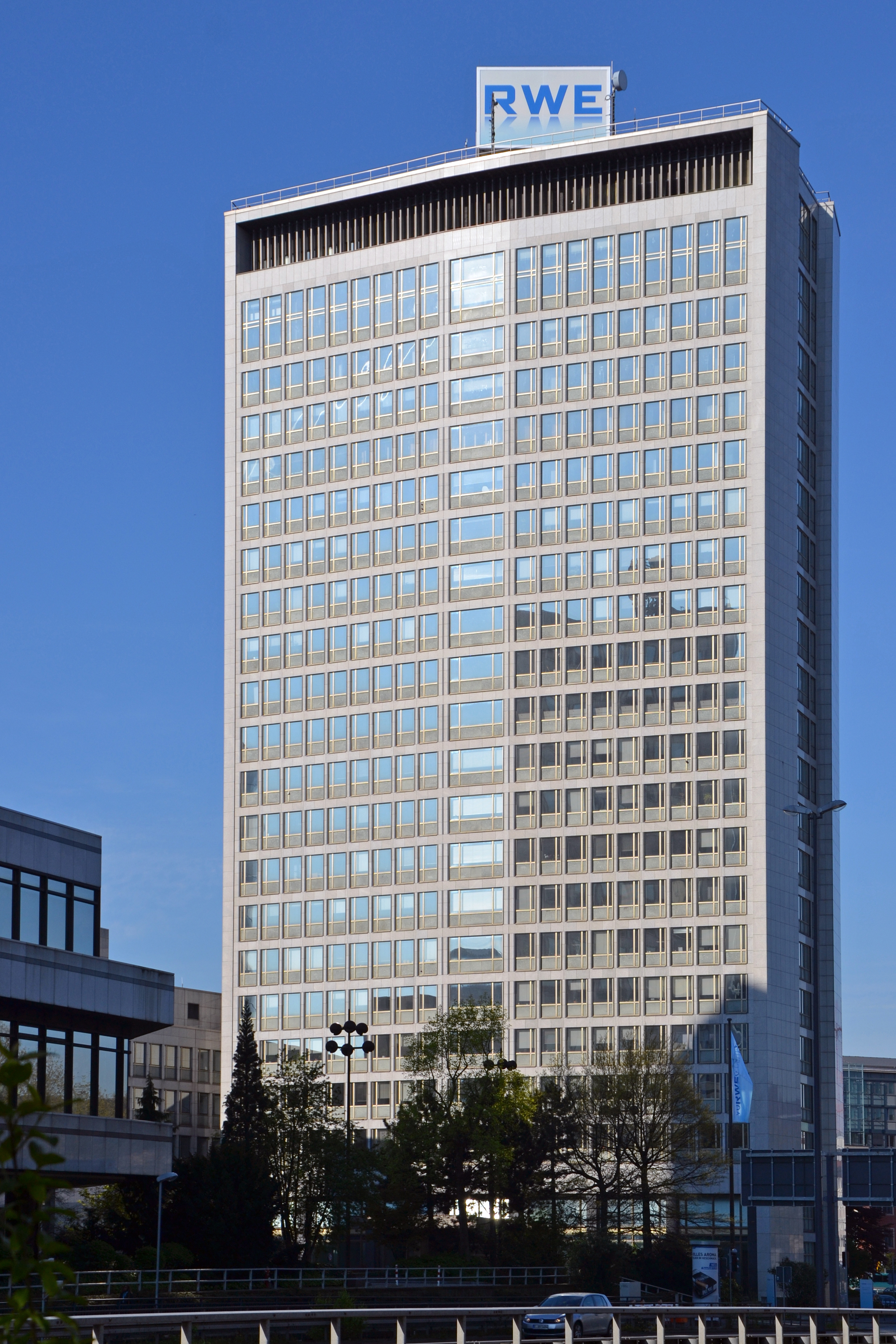
RWE AG headquarters

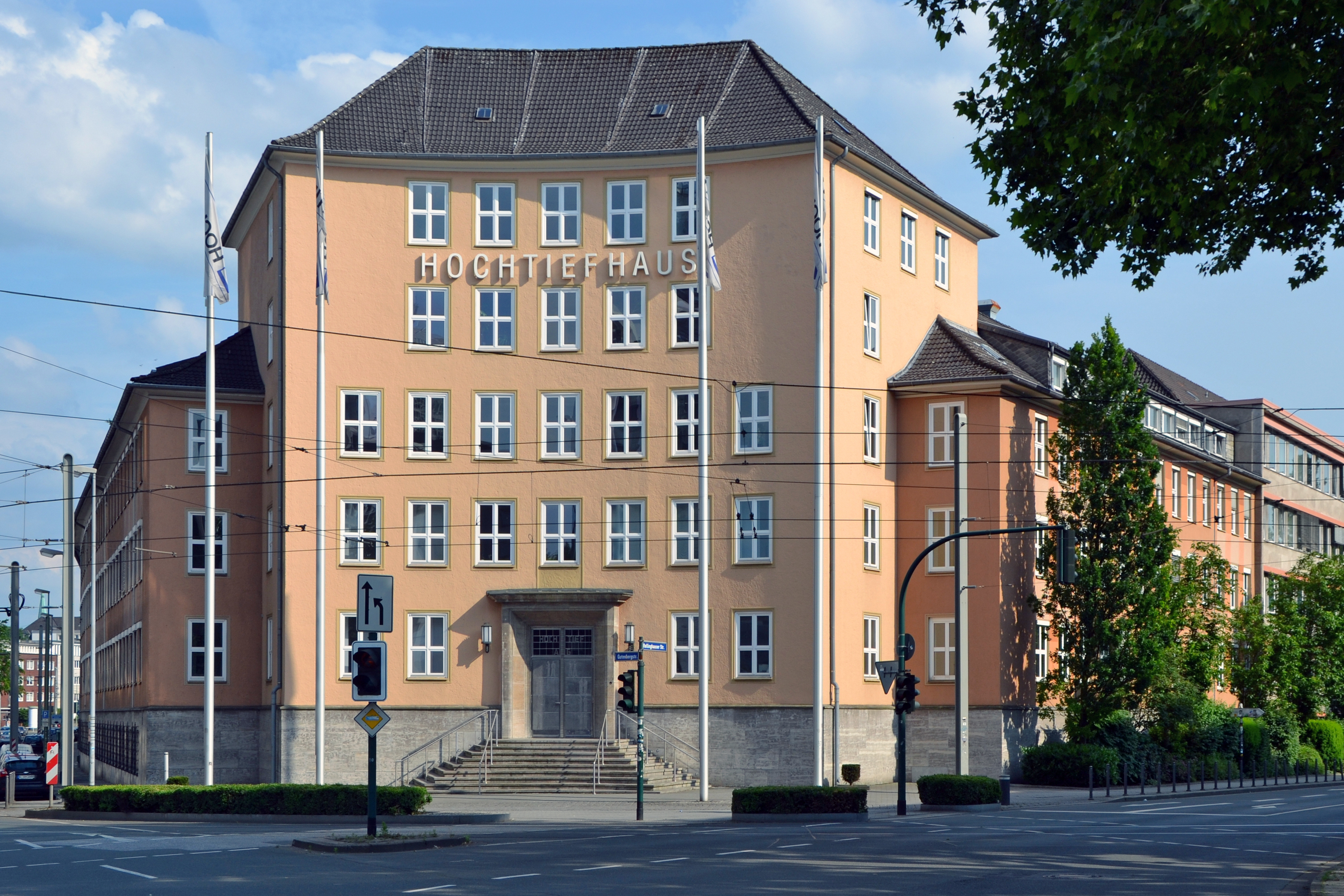
Hochtief headquarters

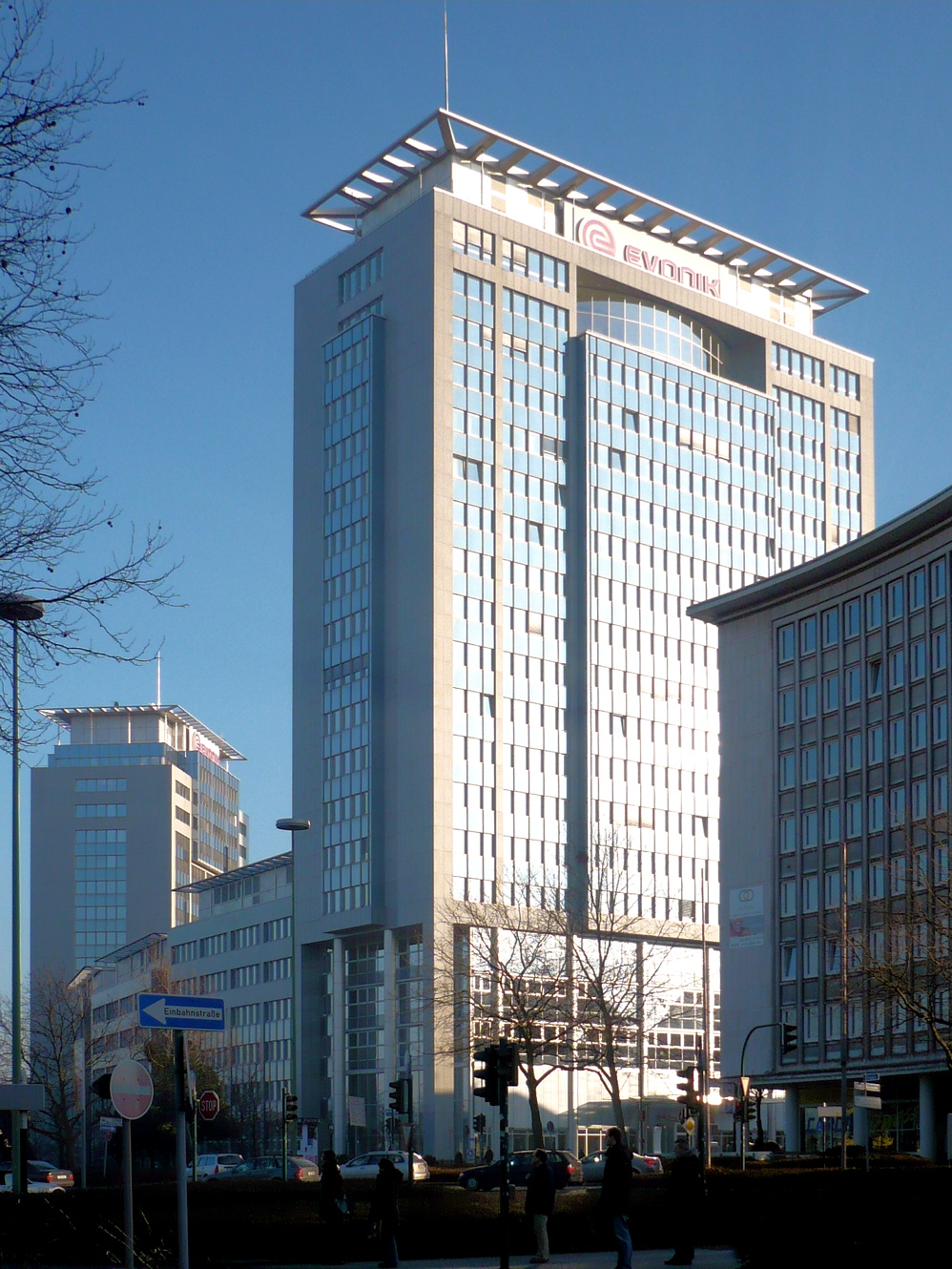
Evonik Industries headquarters

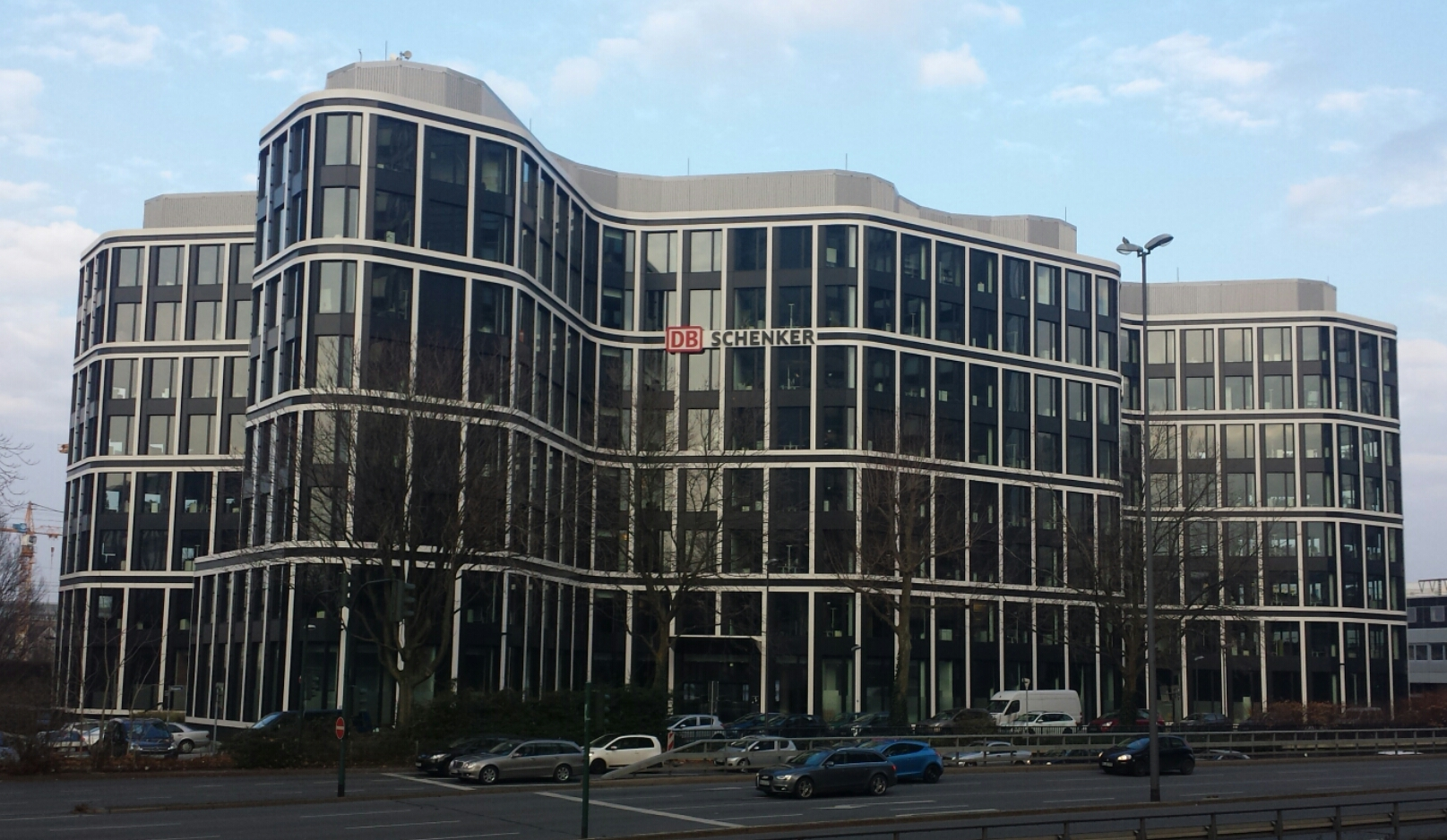
Schenker AG headquarters

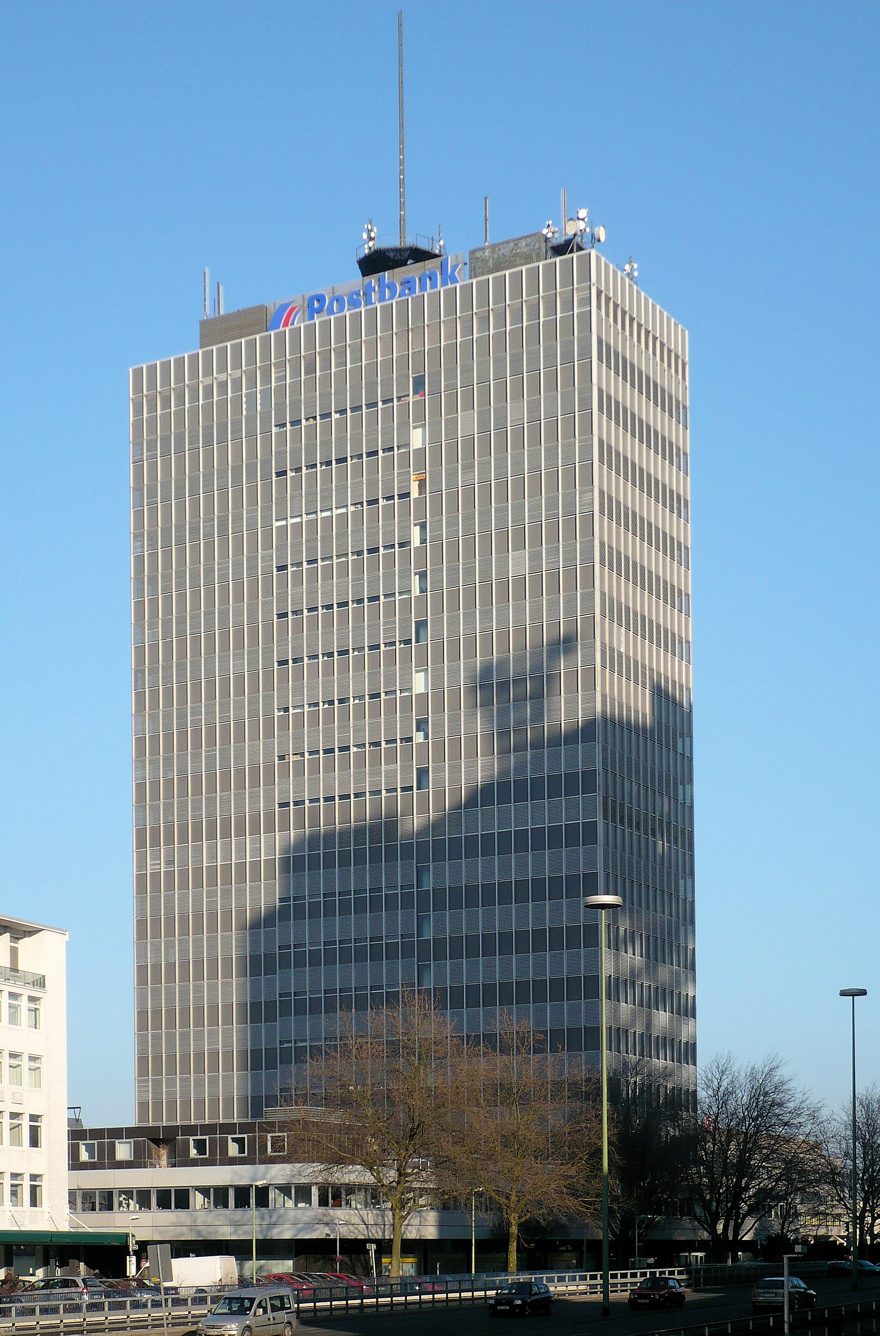
Postbank Essen

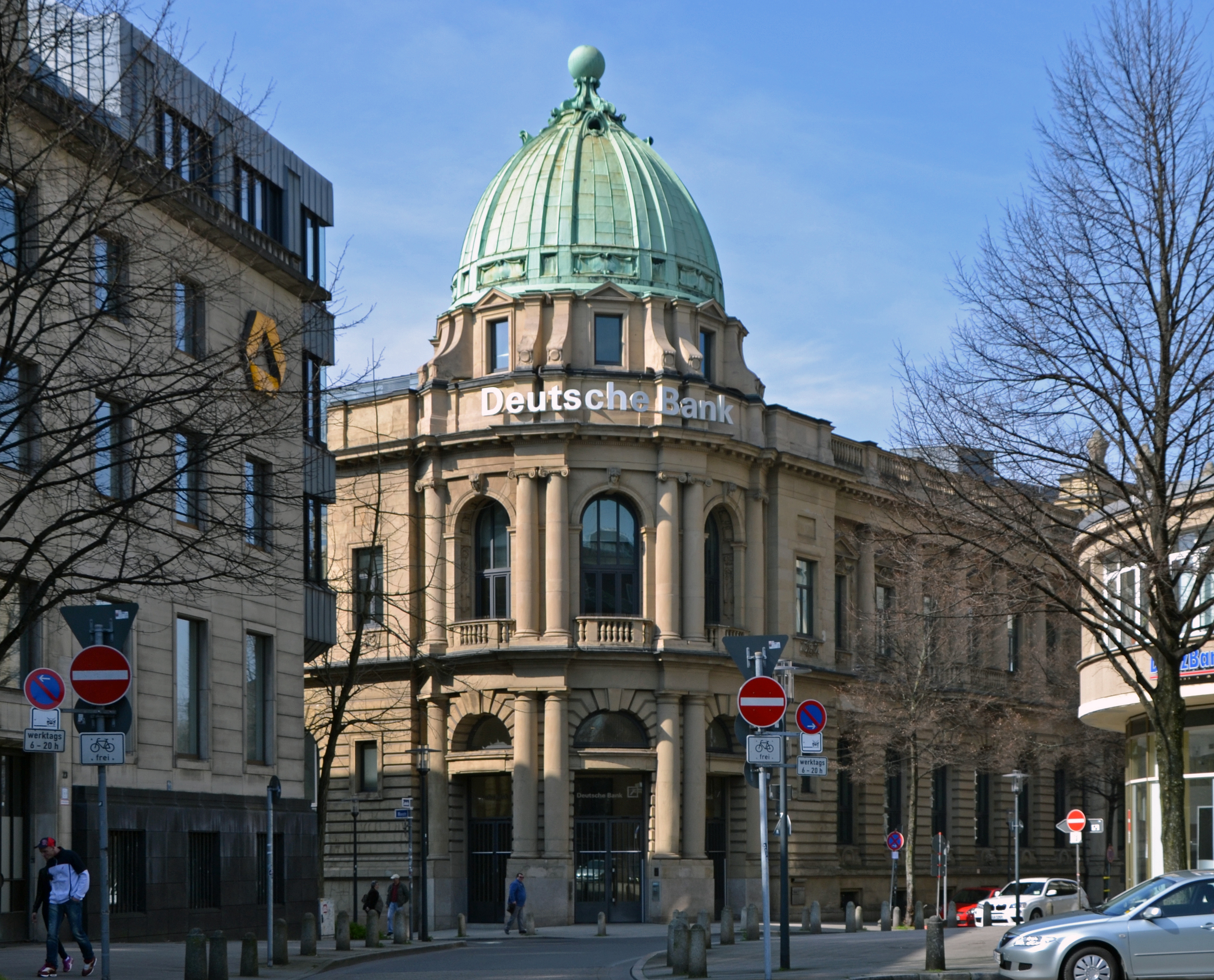
Deutsche Bank branch in the financial district

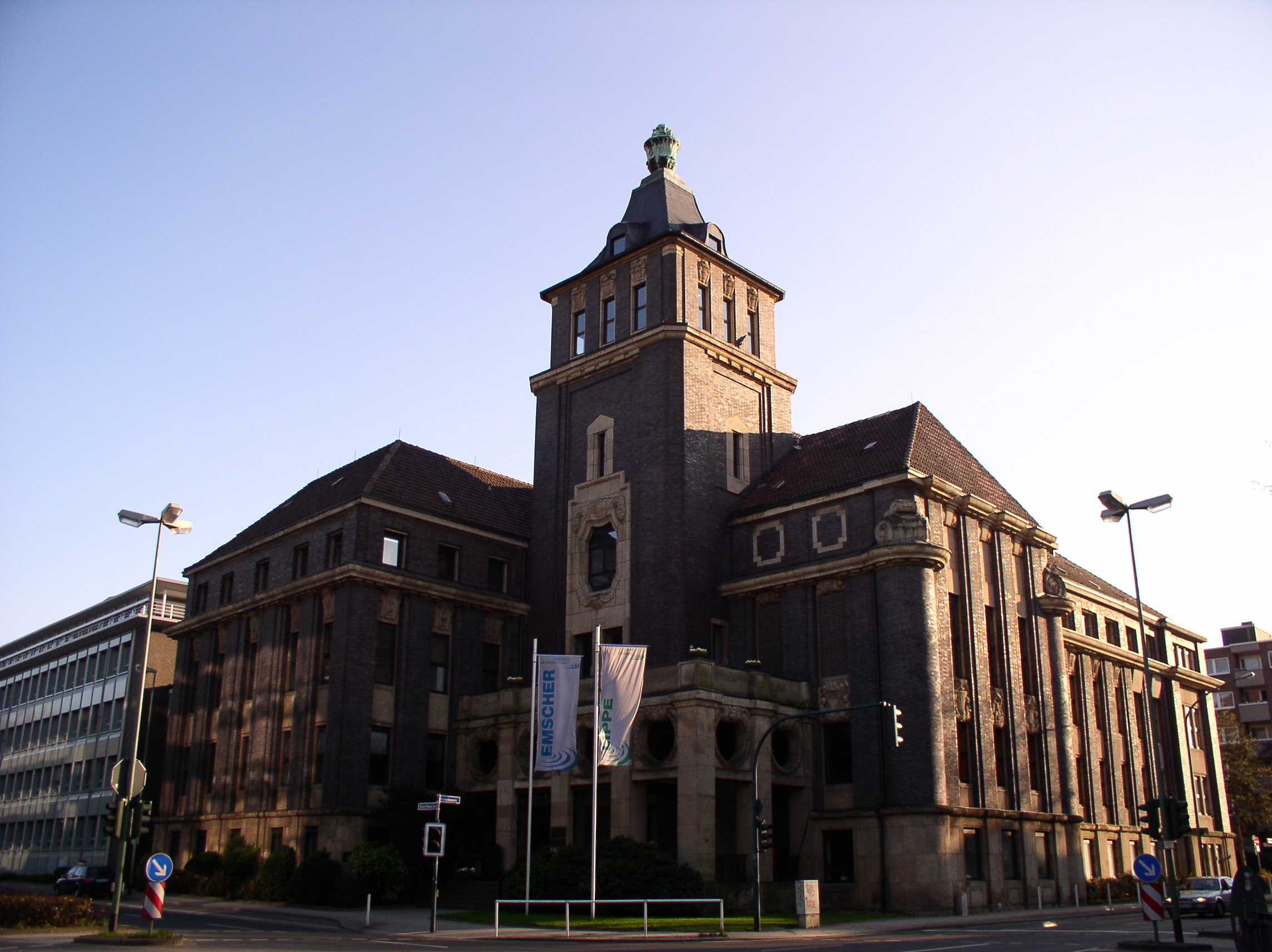
Emschergenossenschaft Essen

=== Fairs ===
Messe Essen logo

The city's exhibition centre, Messe Essen, hosts some 50 trade fairs each year. With around 530.000 visitors each year, Essen Motor Show is by far the largest event held there. It has been described as "the showcase event of the year for the tuning community" and as the German version of the annual SEMA auto show in Las Vegas. As contrasted with the Frankfurt Auto Show, the Essen show is smaller and is focused on car tuning and racing interests. Other important fairs open to consumers include SPIEL, the world's biggest consumer fair for tabletop gaming, and one of the leading fairs for equestrian sports, Equitana, held every two years. Important fairs restricted to professionals include "Security" (security and fire protection), IPM (gardening) and E-World (energy and water).

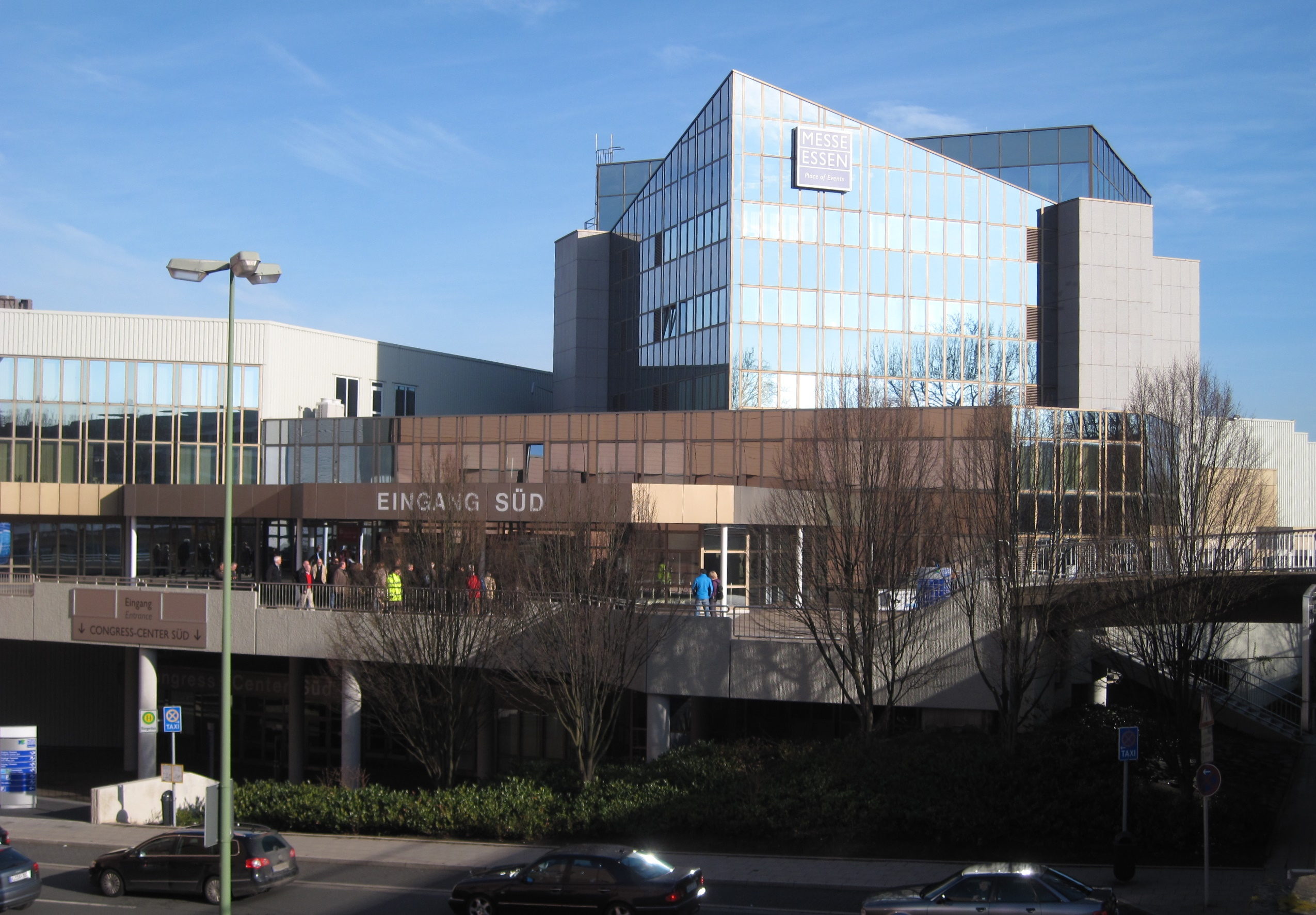
Messe Essen south entrance

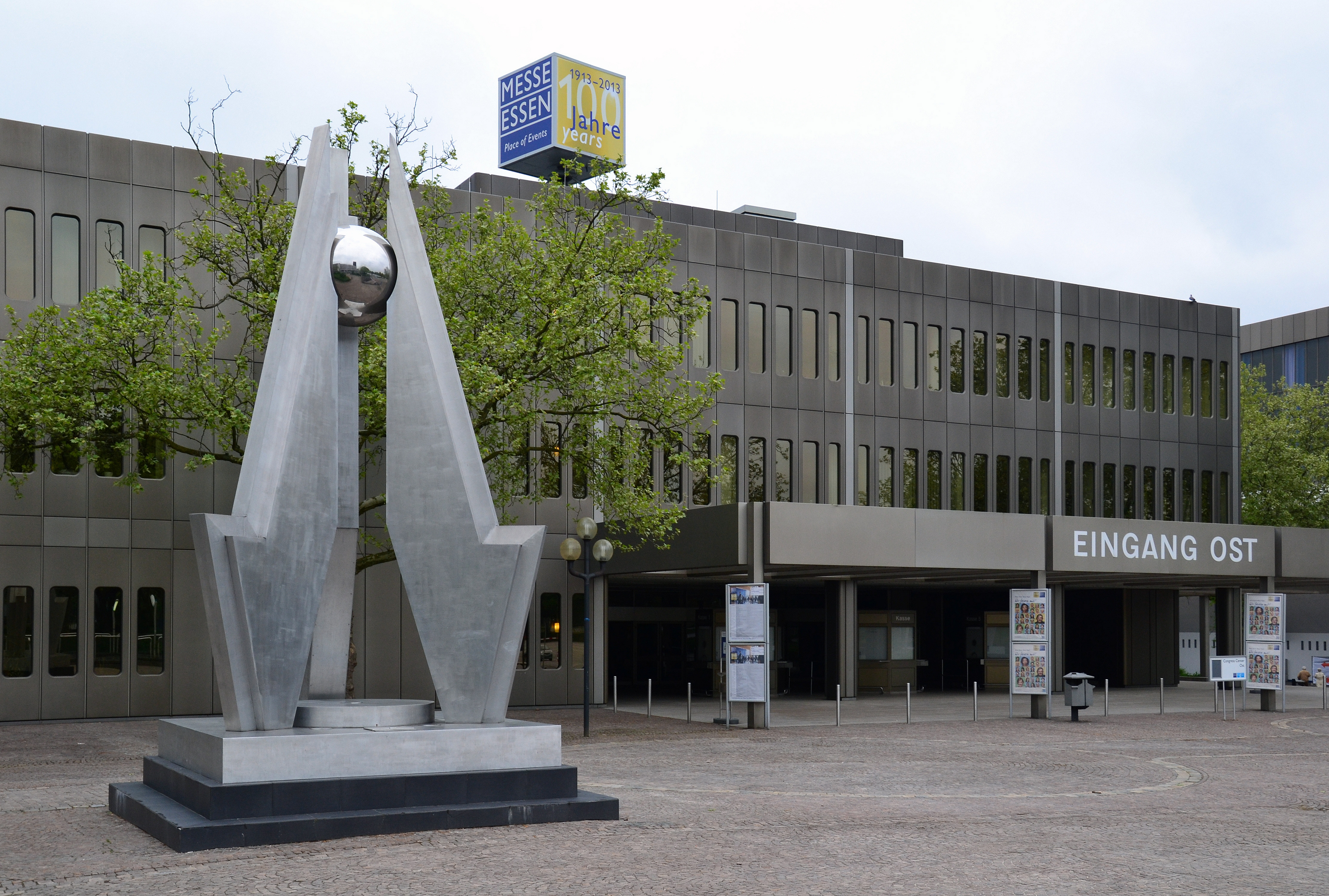
Messe Essen east entrance

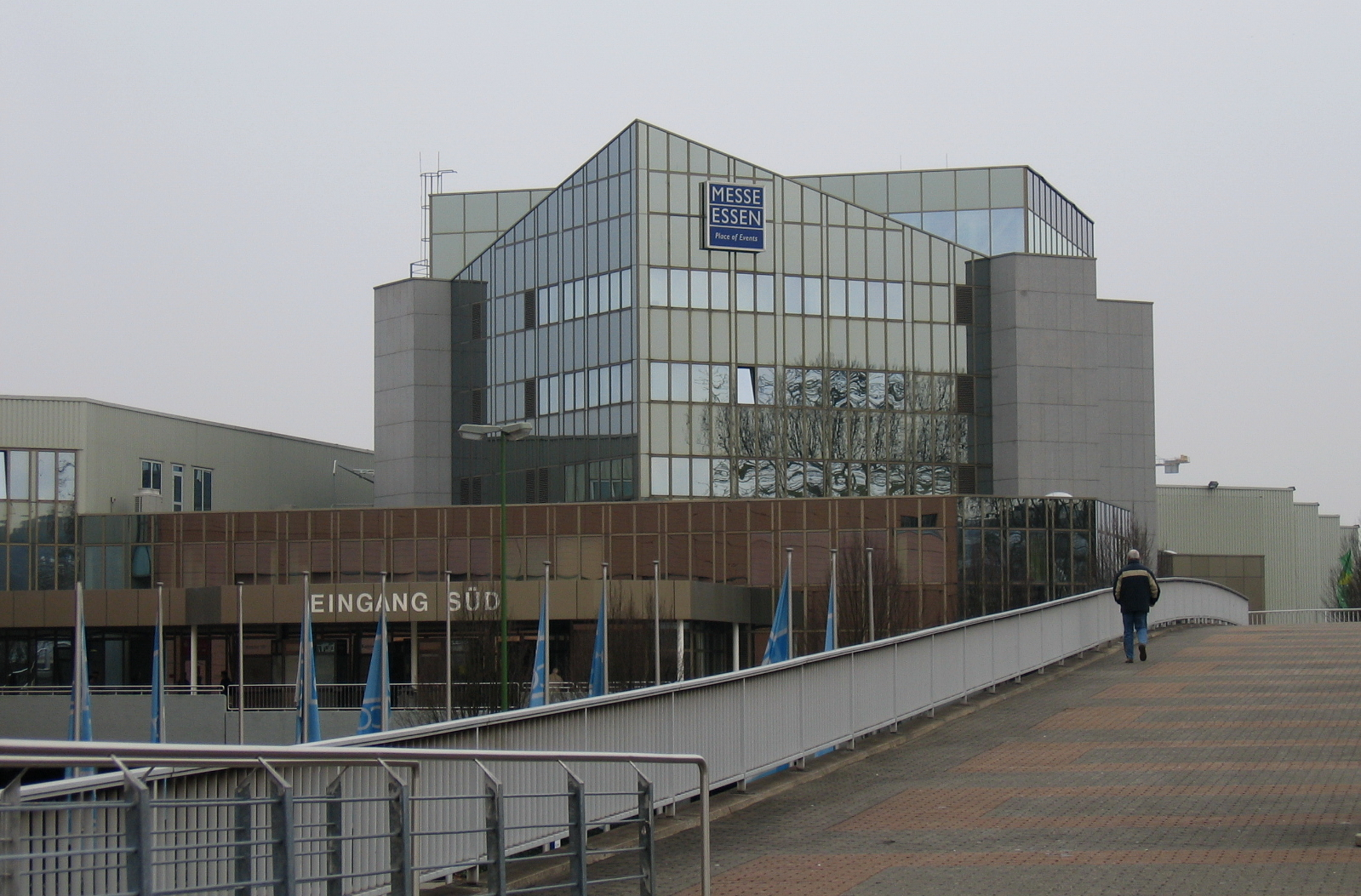
Messe Essen south entrance

=== Media ===
The Westdeutscher Rundfunk has a studio in Essen, which is responsible for the central Ruhr area. Each day, it produces a 30-minute regional evening news magazine (called Lokalzeit Ruhr), a five-minute afternoon news programme, and several radio news programmes. A local broadcasting station went on air in the late 1990s. The WAZ Media Group is one of the most important (print) media companies in Europe and publishes the Ruhr area's two most important daily newspapers, Westdeutsche Allgemeine Zeitung (WAZ; 580,000 copies) and Neue Ruhr/Rhein Zeitung (NRZ; 180,000 copies). In Essen, the WAZ Group also publishes the local Borbecker Nachrichten and Werdener Nachrichten, both of which had been independent weekly newspapers for parts of Essen. Additionally, the Axel Springer AG runs a printing facility for their boulevard-style daily paper Bild in Essen.

=== Education ===
One renowned educational institution in Essen is the Folkwang University, a university of the arts founded in 1927, which is headquartered in Essen and has additional facilities in Duisburg, Bochum and Dortmund. Since 1927, its traditional main location has been in the former Werden Abbey in Essen in the Ruhr area, with additional facilities in Duisburg, Bochum, and Dortmund, and, since 2010, at the Zeche Zollverein, a World Heritage Site also in Essen. The Folkwang University is home to the international dance company Folkwang Tanz Studio (FTS). In 1963 the Folkwang school was renamed Folkwang Academy (Folkwang-Hochschule). In 2010 the institution began offering graduate studies and was renamed Folkwang University of the Arts. This coincided with Ruhr.2010, the festival in which the Ruhr district was designated the European Capital of Culture for the year 2010.

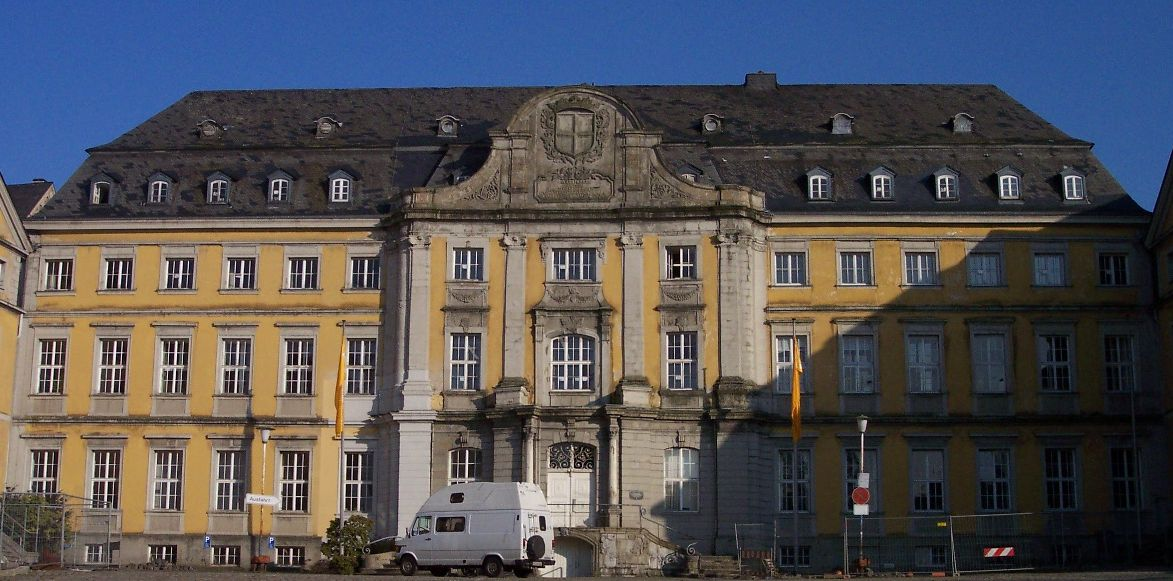
Folkwang University of the Arts

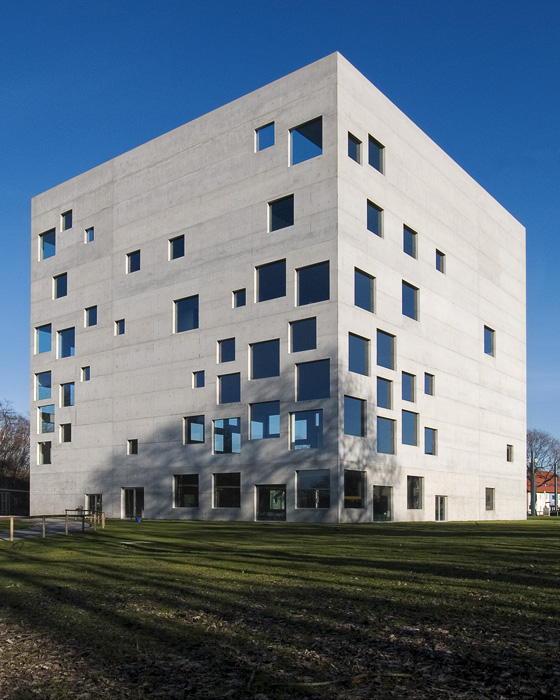
Zollverein School of Management and Design

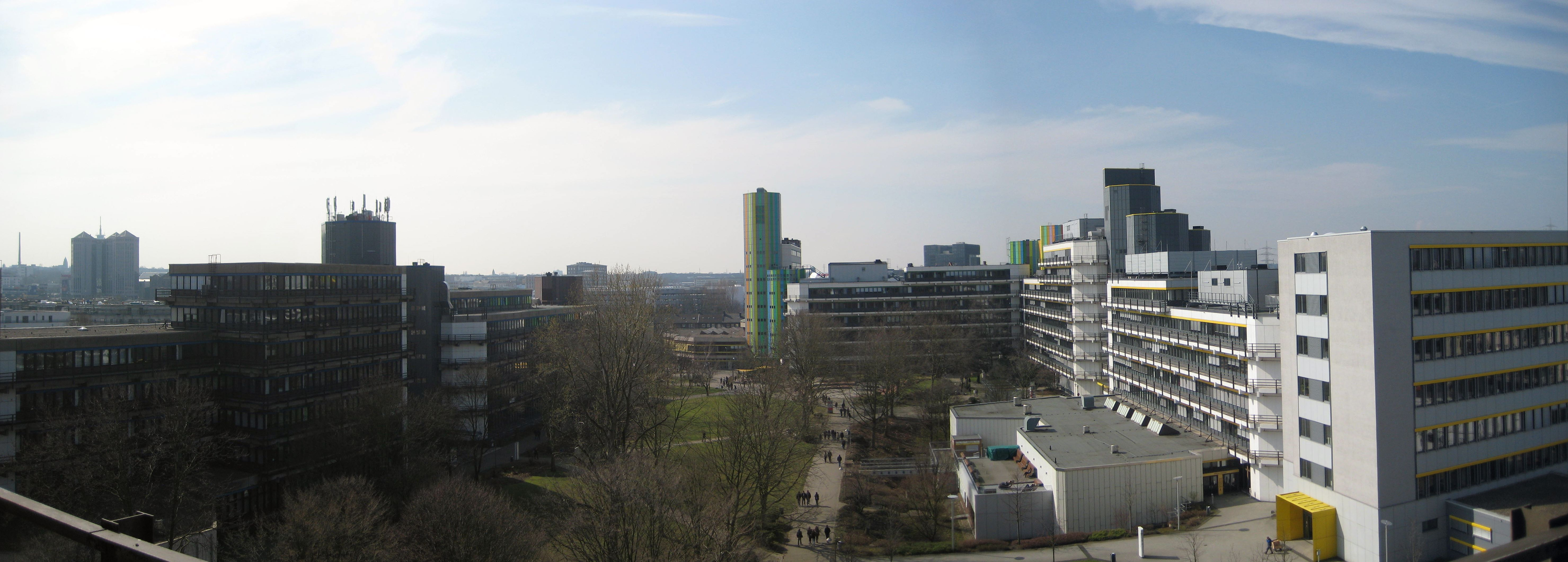
Universität Essen

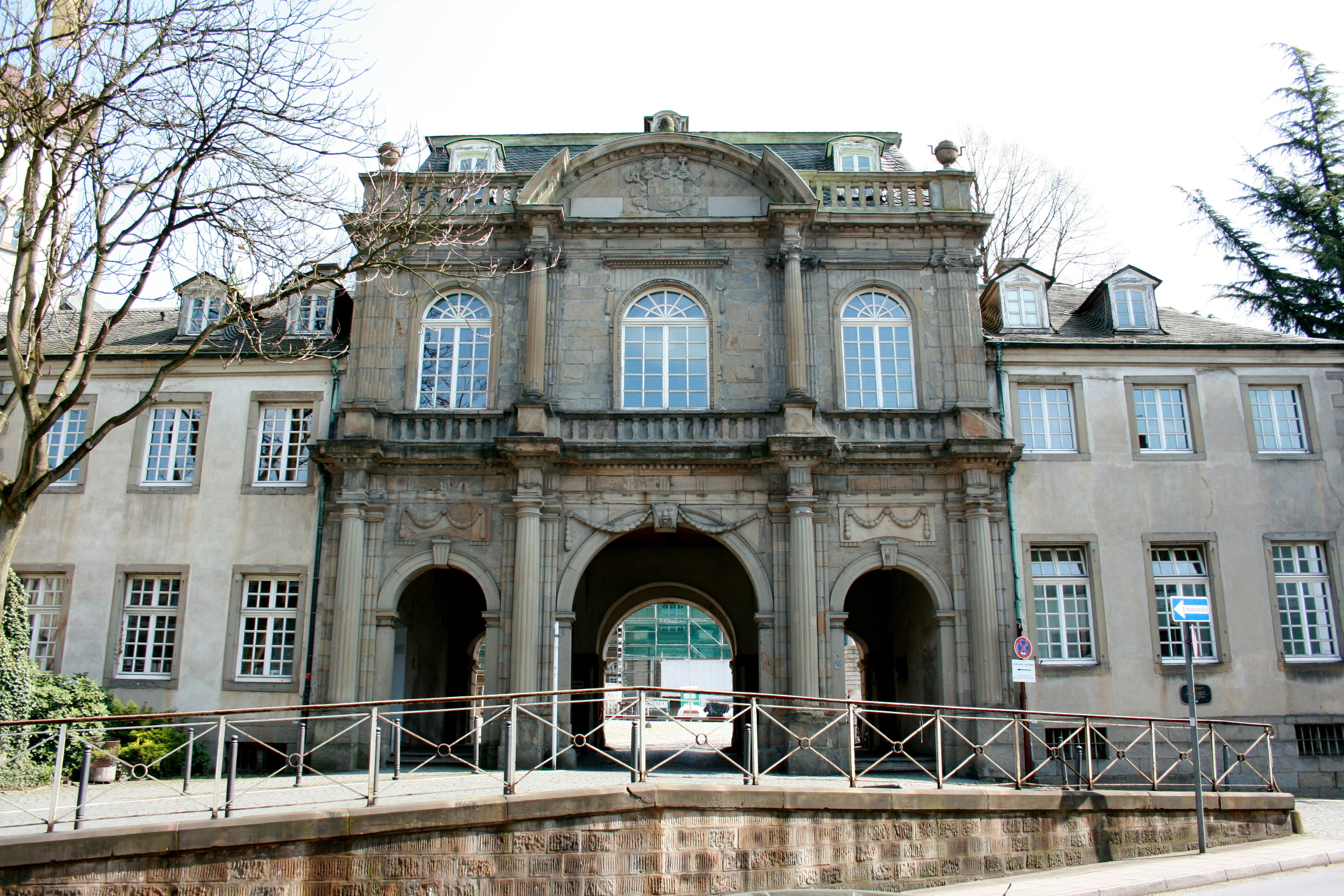
Folkwang University

The University of Duisburg-Essen, which resulted from a 2003 merger of the universities of Essen and Duisburg, is one of Germany's "youngest" universities with about 42,000 Students. One of its primary research areas is urban systems (i.e., sustainable development, logistics and transportation), a theme largely inspired by the highly urbanised Ruhr area. Other fields include nanotechnology, discrete mathematics and "education in the 21st century". Another university in Essen is the private Fachhochschule für Ökonomie und Management, a university of applied sciences with over 6,000 students and branches in 15 other major cities throughout Germany.

=== Medicine ===
Essen offers a highly diversified health care system with more than 1,350 resident doctors and almost 6,000 beds in 13 hospitals, including a university hospital. The University Hospital Essen (Universitätsklinikum Essen) dates back to 1909, when the city council established a municipal hospital; although it was largely destroyed during World War II, it was later rebuilt, and finally gained the title of a university hospital in 1963. It focuses on diseases of the circulatory system (West German Heart Centre Essen), oncology and transplantation medicine, with the department of bone marrow transplantation being the second-largest of its kind in the world.

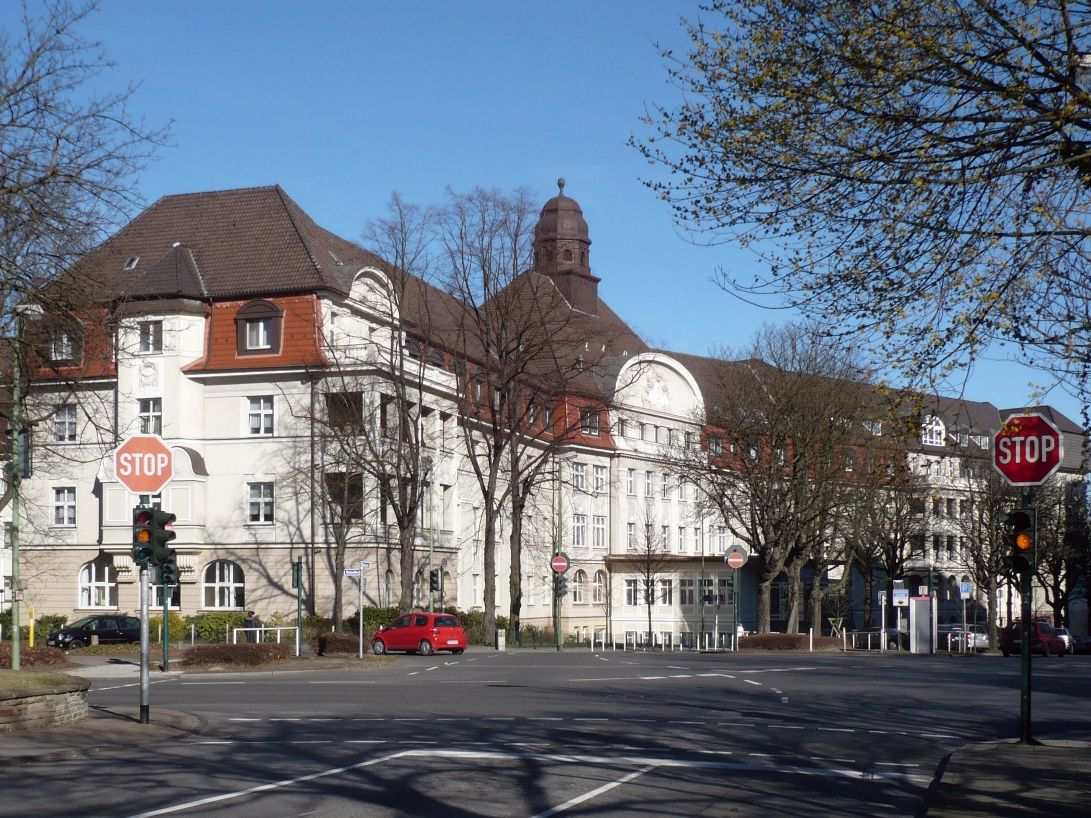
Elisabethkrankenhaus Essen

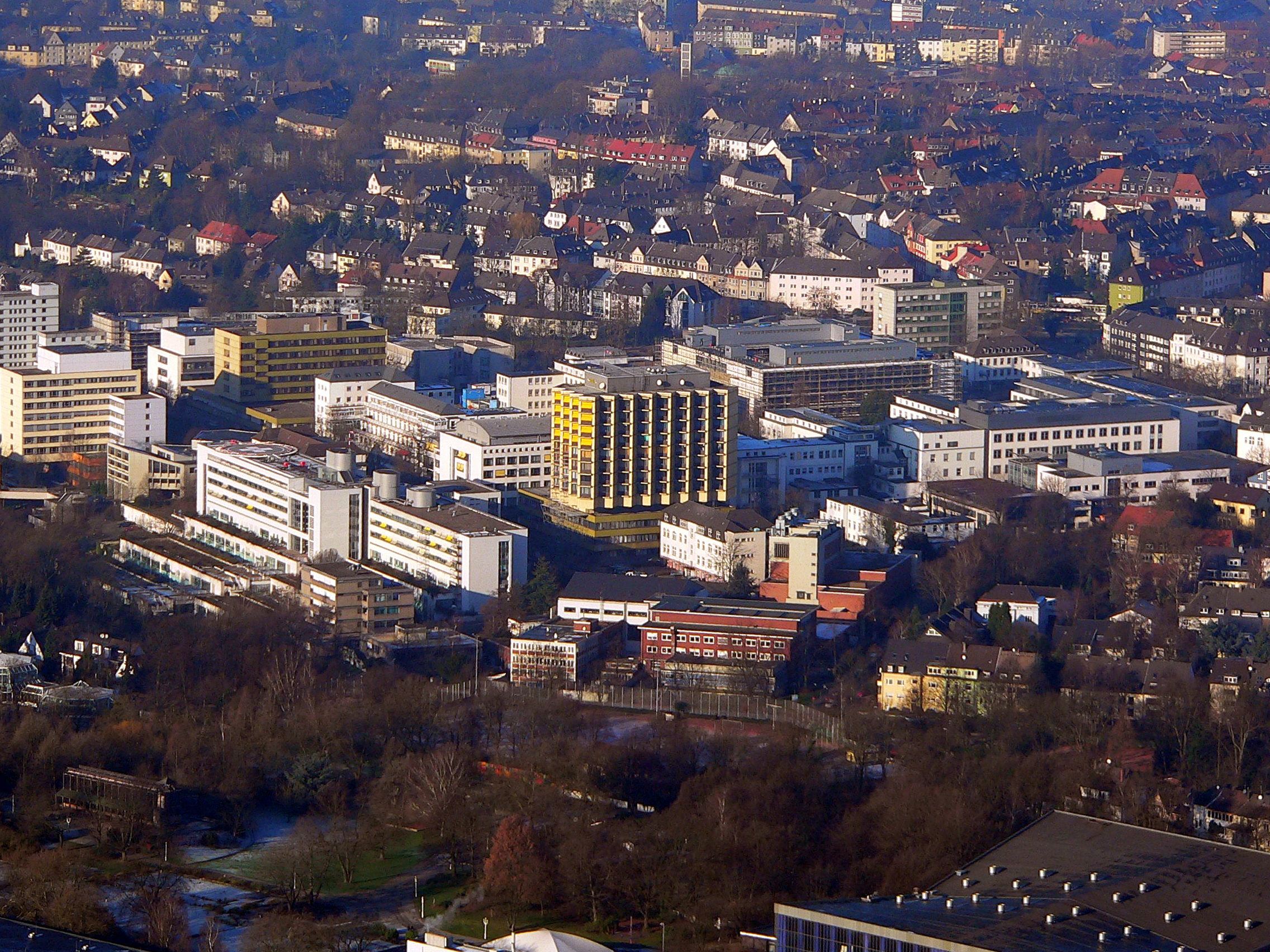
University Hospital Essen

== Transport ==
=== Streets and motorways ===
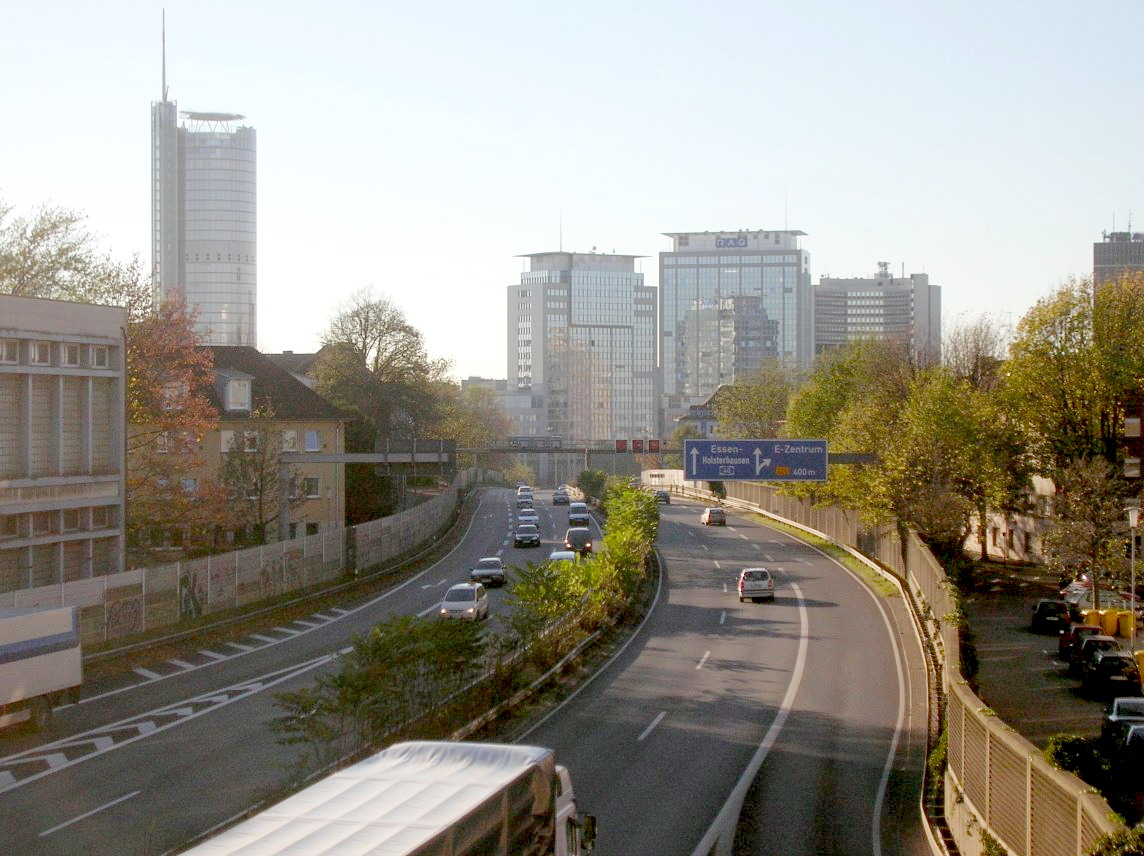
Ruhrschnellweg towards the central business district of Essen

The road network of Essen consists of over 3,200 streets, which in total have a length of roughly 1,600 kilometres (994 mi).

Four Autobahnen run through the territory of Essen, most importantly the A 40, known as Ruhrschnellweg (lit. 'Ruhr expressway'), which runs vertically through the city, dividing it roughly in half. Towards the west, the A 40 connects the Dutch city of Venlo with Dortmund, running through the whole Ruhr area. It is one of the arterial roads of the Ruhr area (carrying over 140,000 vehicles per day) and suffers from heavy congestion during rush hours, which is why many people in the area nicknamed it Ruhrschleichweg (lit. 'Ruhr crawlway'). A tunnel was built in the 1970s, when the then-Bundesstraße was upgraded to motorway standards, so that the A 40 is hidden from public view in the inner-city district near the main railway station.

In the north, the A 42 briefly touches Essen territory, serving as an interconnection between the neighboring cities of Oberhausen and Gelsenkirchen and destinations beyond.

A part of the A 44, a highly segmented connection from Aachen and the Belgian border to Kassel, planned to go further into central Germany, ends in Essen's south.

A segment of the A 52 connects Essen with the more southern region around Düsseldorf. On Essen territory, the A 52 runs from the southern boroughs near Mülheim an der Ruhr past the fairground and then merges with the Ruhrschnellweg at the Autobahndreieck Essen-Ost junction east of the city centre.

With the A 40/A 52 in the southern parts of the city and the A 42 in the north, there is a gap in the motorway system often leading to congestion on streets leading from the central to the northern boroughs. An extension of the A 52 to connect the Essen-Ost junction with the A 42 to close this gap is considered urgent; it has been planned for years but not yet been realized – most importantly due to the high-density areas this extension would lead through, resulting in high costs and concerns with the citizens.

=== Public transport ===
As with most communes in the Ruhr area, local transport is carried out by a local, publicly owned company for transport within the city, the DB Regio subsidiary of Deutsche Bahn for regional transport and Deutsche Bahn itself for long-distance journeys. The local carrier, Ruhrbahn, is a member of the Verkehrsverbund Rhein-Ruhr (VRR) association of public transport companies in the Ruhr area, which provides a uniform fare structure in the whole region. Within the VRR region, tickets are valid on lines of all members as well as DB's railway lines (except the high-speed InterCity and Intercity-Express networks) and can be bought at ticket machines and service centres of Ruhrbahn, all other members of VRR, and DB.

As of 2009, Ruhrbahn operates 3 U-Stadtbahn lines of the Essen Stadtbahn network, 7 Straßenbahn (tram) lines and 57 bus lines (16 of these serving as Nacht Express late-night lines only). The Stadtbahn and Straßenbahn operate on total route lengths of 19.6 kilometres (12.2 mi) and 52.4 kilometres (32.6 mi), respectively. One tram line and a few bus lines coming from neighboring cities are operated by these cities' respective carriers. The U-Stadtbahn, which partly runs on used Docklands Light Railway stock, is a mixture of tram and full underground systems with 20 underground stations for the U-Stadtbahn and additional four underground stations used by the tram. Two lines of the U-Stadtbahn are completely intersection-free and hence independent from other traffic, and the U18 line leading from Mülheim main station to the Bismarckplatz station at the gates of the city centre partly runs above ground amidst the A 40 motorway. The Essen Stadtbahn is one of the Stadtbahn systems integrated into the greater Rhine-Ruhr Stadtbahn network.

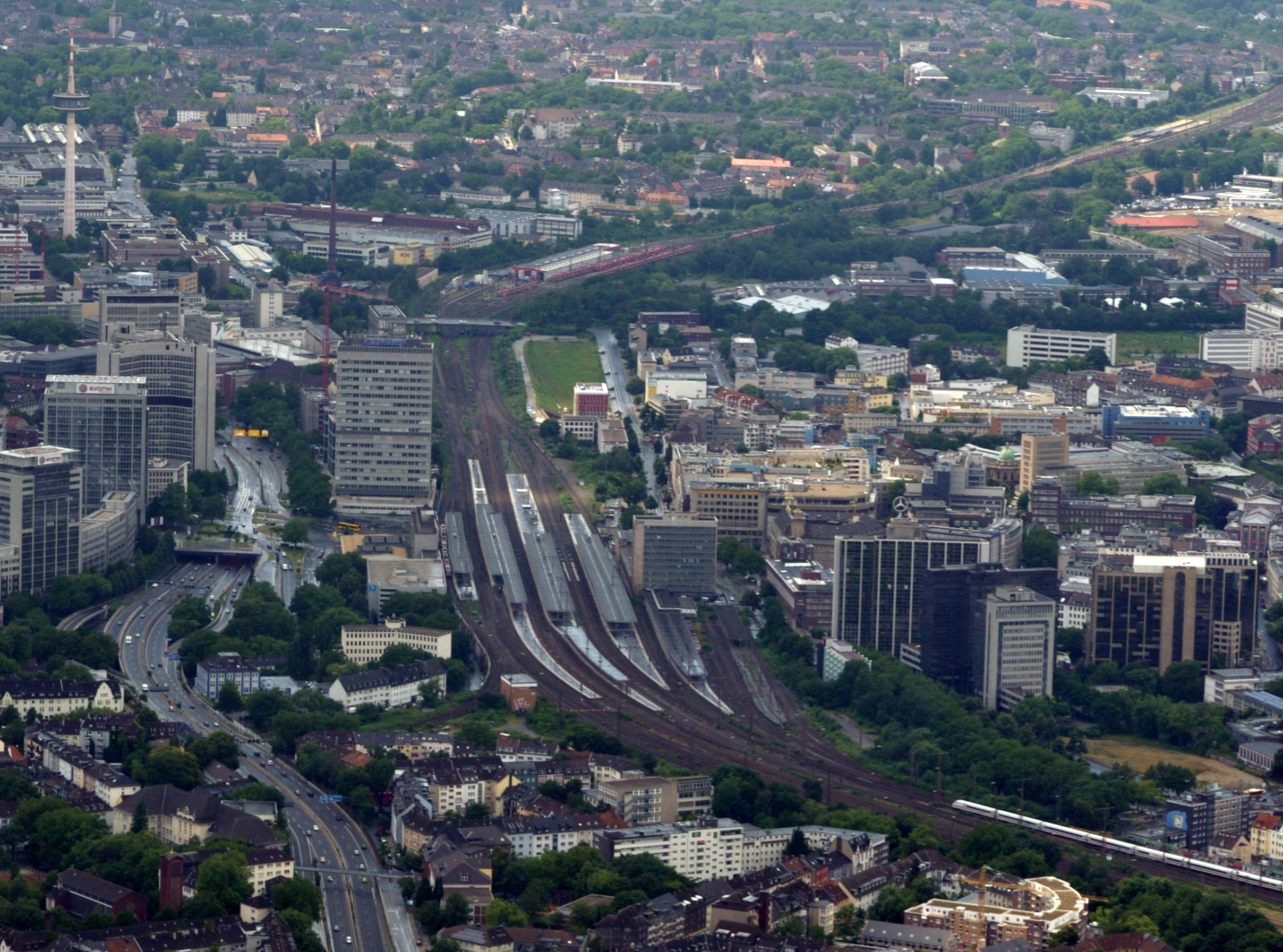
Essen Hauptbahnhof

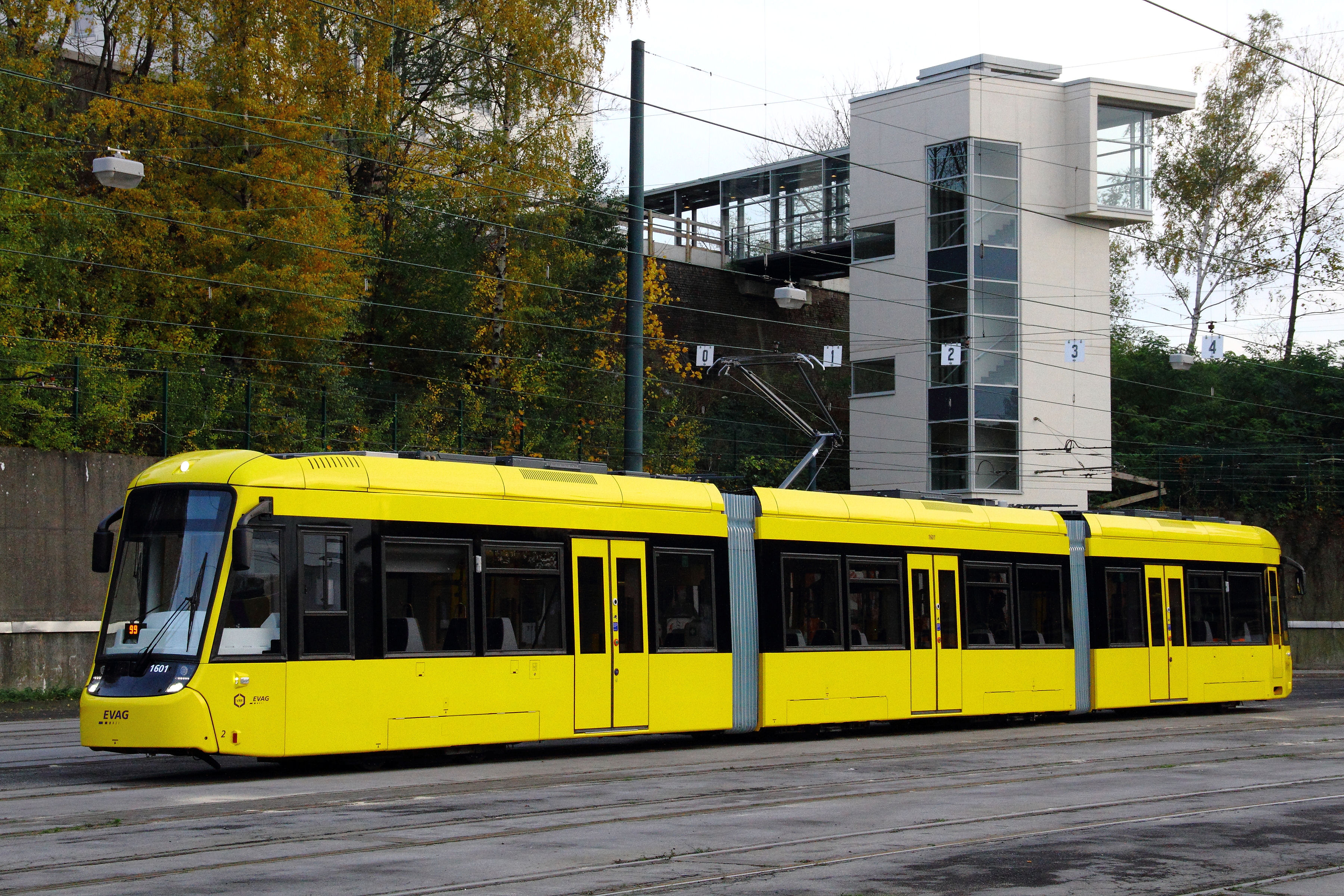
Essen Stadtbahn NF2-TW 1601

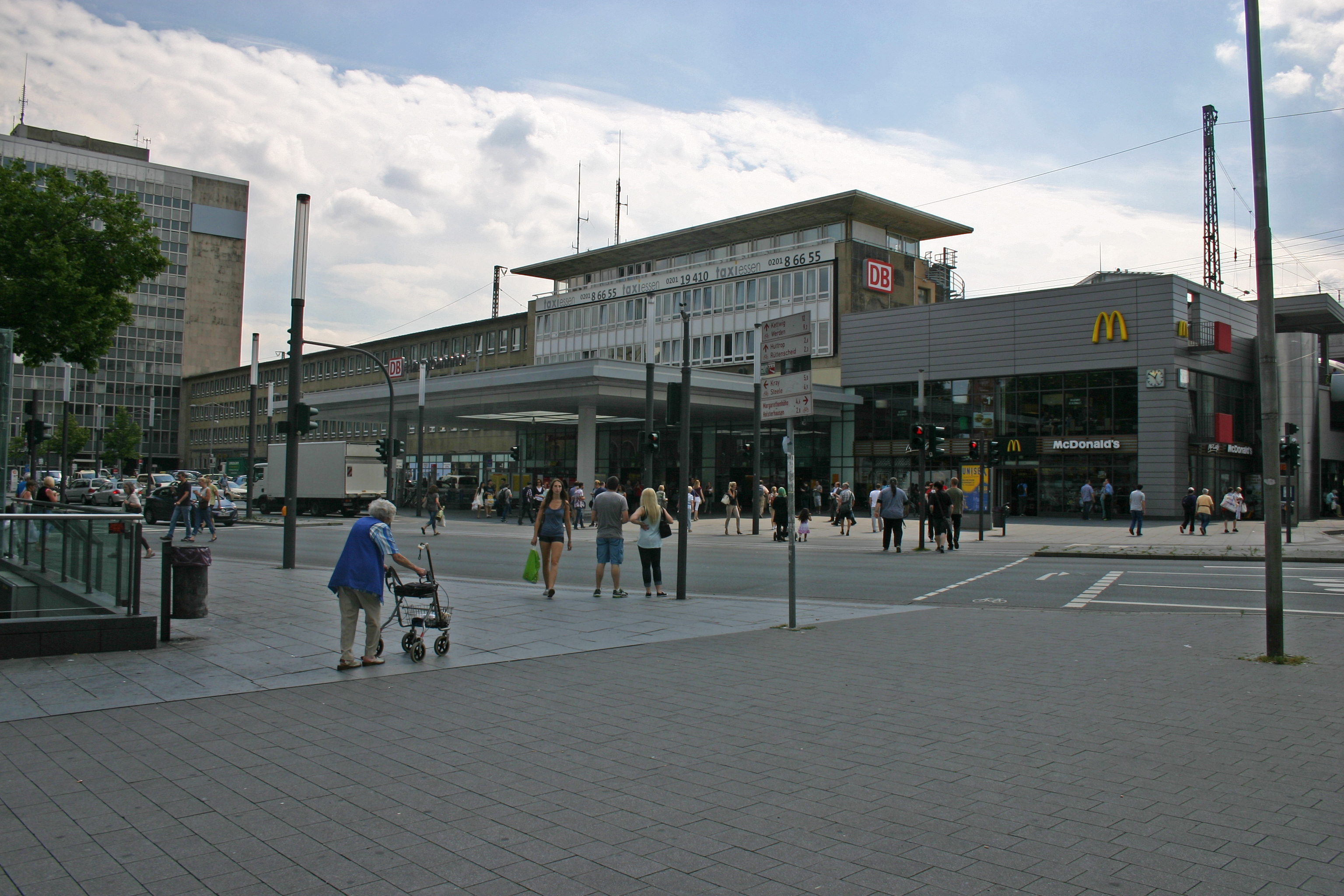
Essen Hauptbahnhof

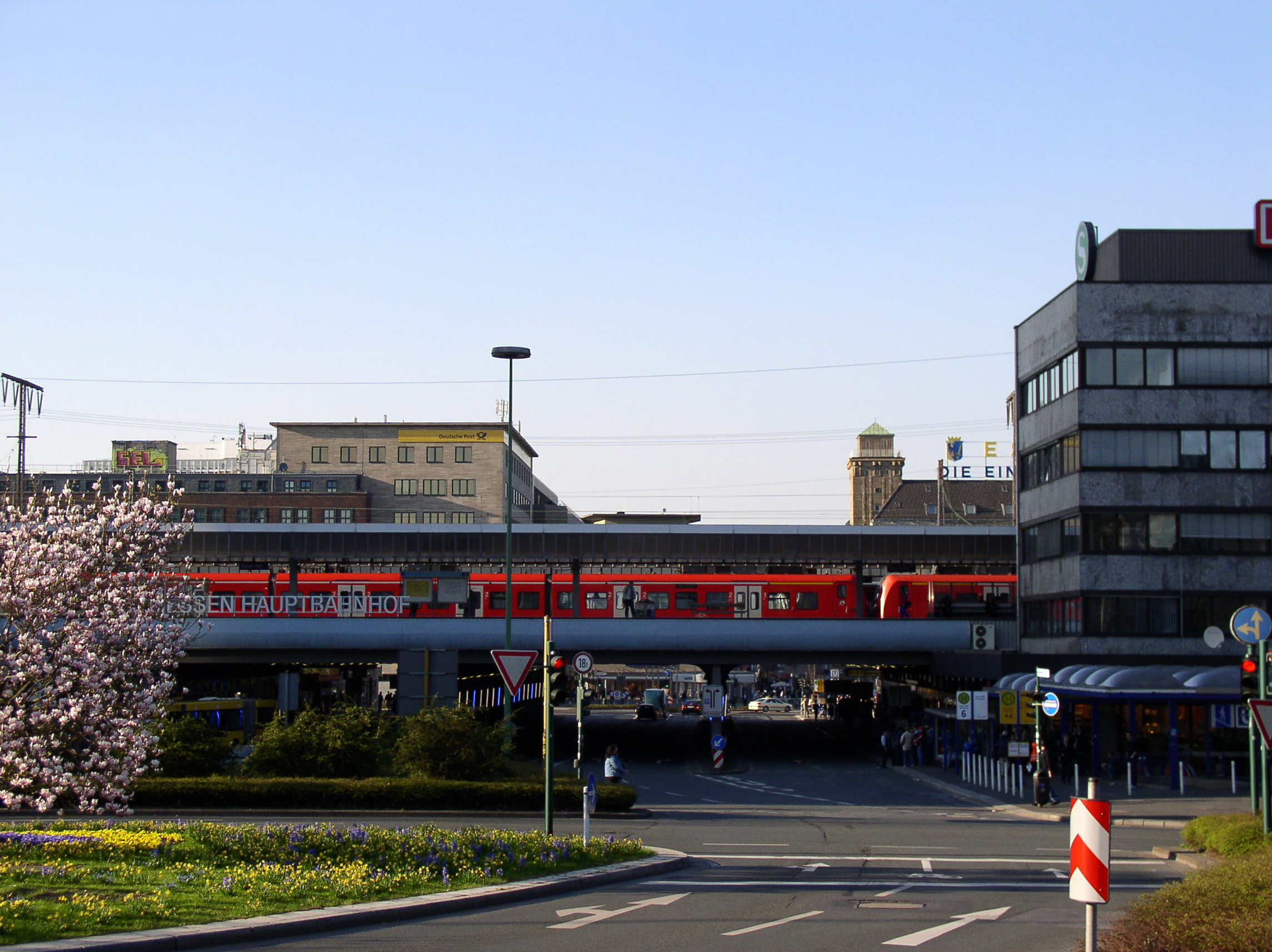
Essen Hauptbahnhof in the city centre

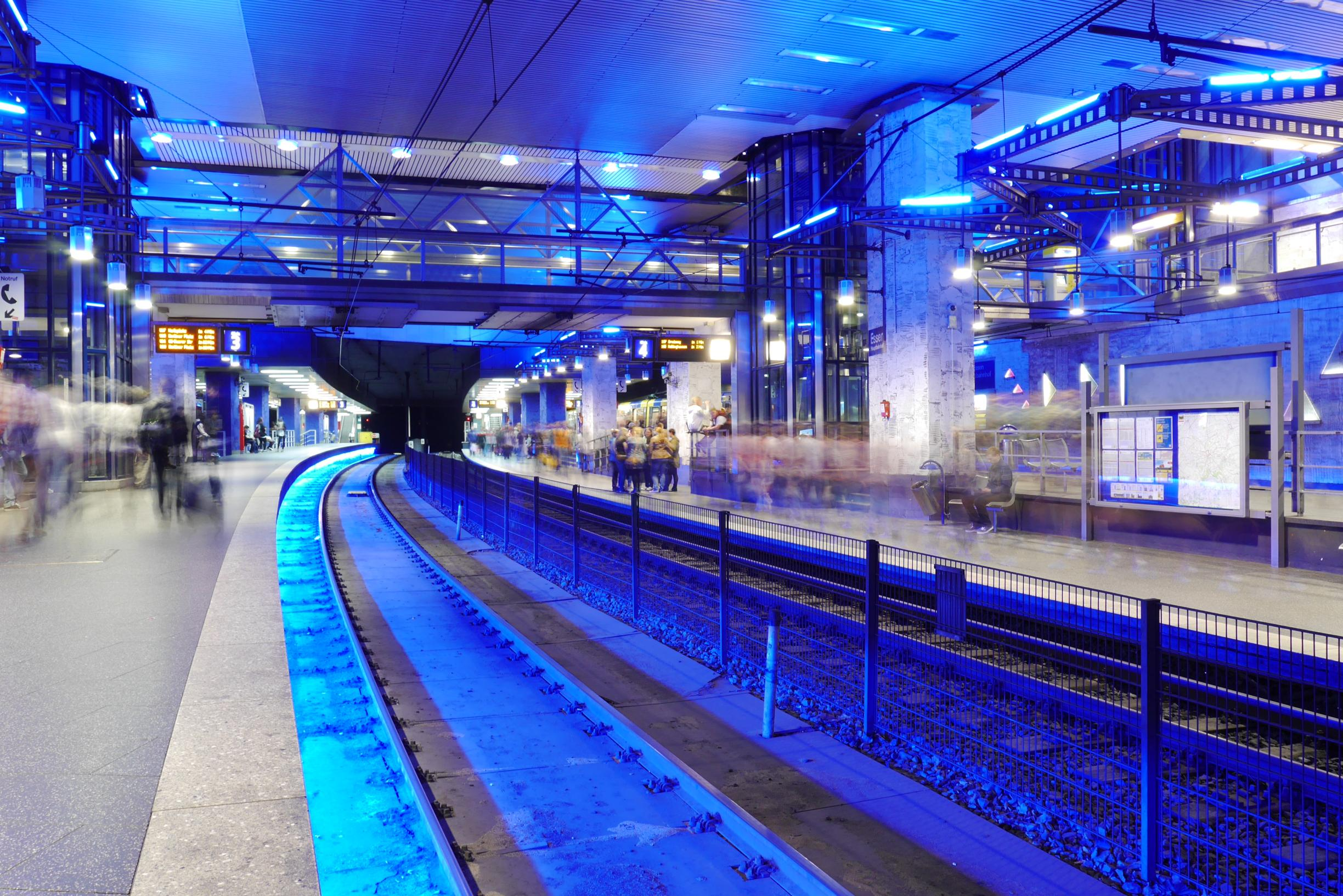
Essen Hauptbahnhof subway station

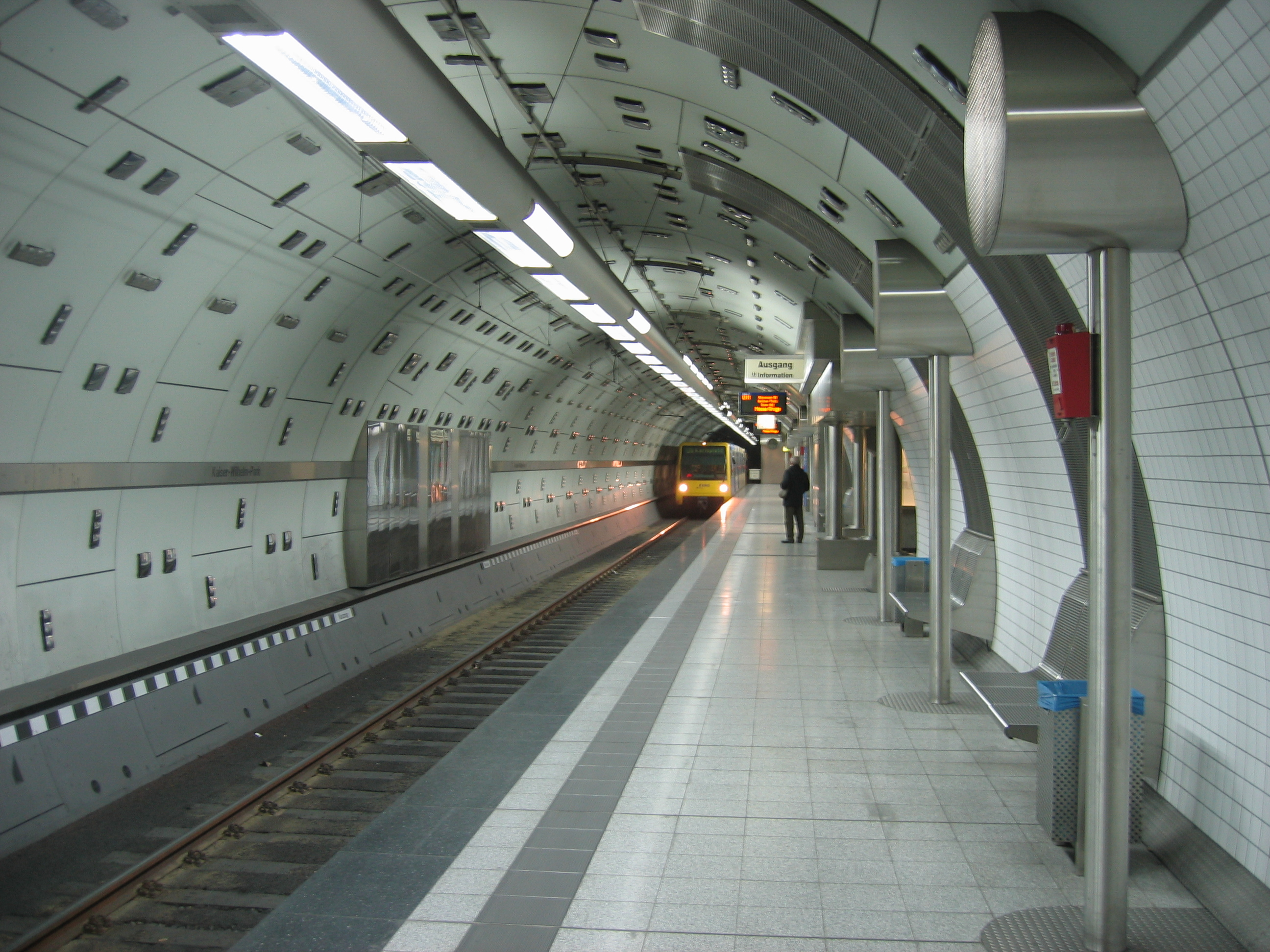
Platforms at Kaiser-Wilhelm-Park

On the same motorway, a long-term test of a guided bus system is being held since 1980. Many Ruhrbahn rail lines meet at the main station but only a handful of bus lines. However, all but one of the Night Express bus lines either originate from or lead to Essen Hauptbahnhof in a star-shaped manner. All Ruhrbahn lines, including the Night Express lines, are closed on weekdays from 1:30 am to 4:30 am.

Of the Rhein-Ruhr S-Bahn network's 13 lines, 5 lines lead through Essen territory and meet at the Essen Hauptbahnhof main station, which also serves as the connection to the Regional-Express and Intercity-Express network of regional and nationwide high-speed trains, respectively. Other important stations in Essen, where regional and local traffic are connected, are the Regionalbahnhöfe (regional railway stations) in the boroughs of Altenessen, Borbeck, Kray and Steele. Further 20 S-Bahn stations can be found in the whole urban area.

In 2017, the public transport organization of Mülheim, the Mülheimer Verkehrsgesellschaft (MVG) and the Essener Verkehrsgesellschaft (EVAG) merged and became the Ruhrbahn. All vehicles and staff were merged and are now operated together.

=== Aviation ===
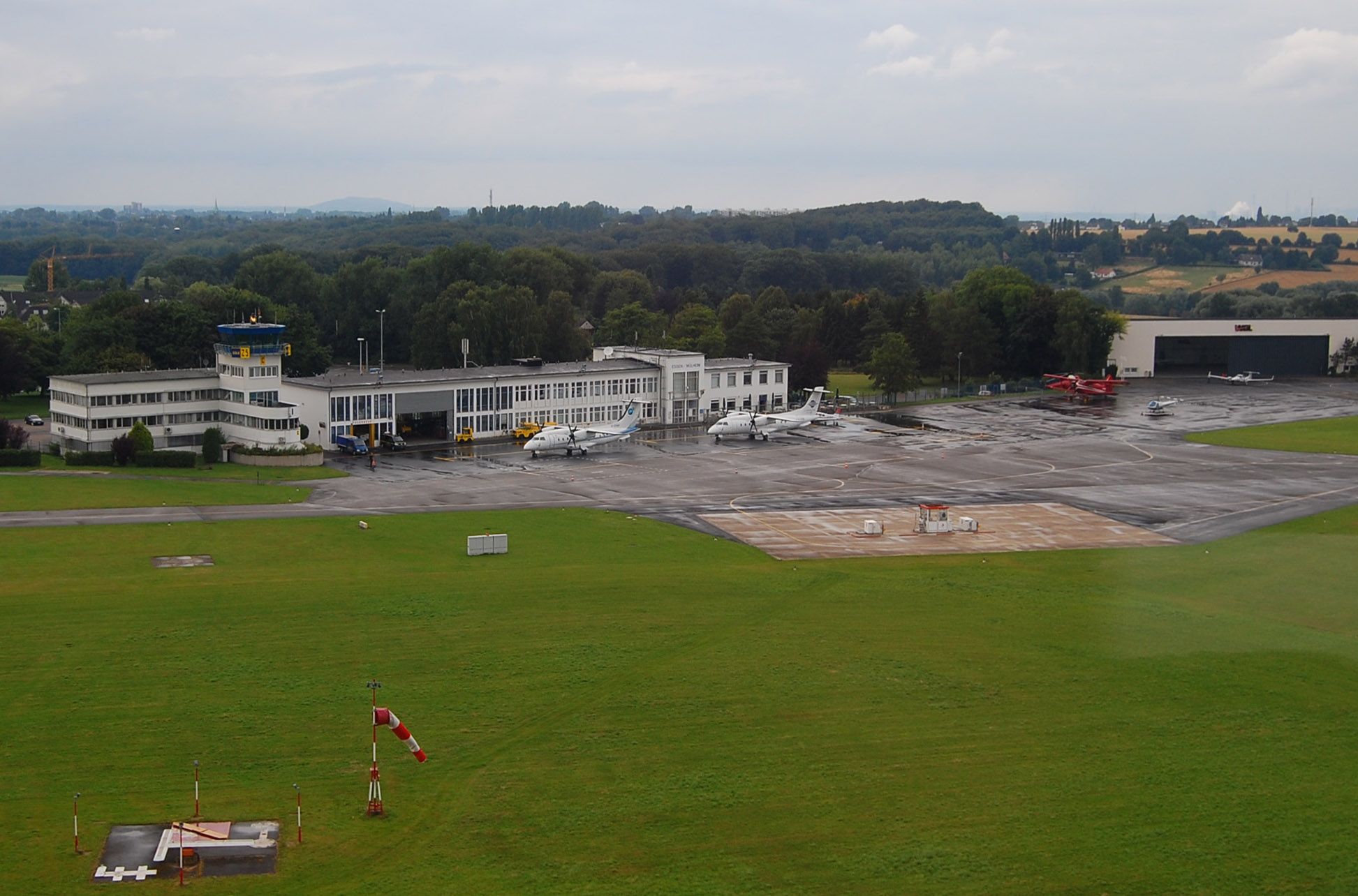
Essen/Mülheim Airport

Together with the neighbouring city of Mülheim an der Ruhr and the state of North Rhine-Westphalia, Essen maintains Essen/Mülheim Airport (IATA: ESS, ICAO: EDLE). While the first flights had already arrived in 1919, it was officially opened on 25 August 1925. Significantly expanded in 1935, Essen/Mülheim became the central airport of the Ruhr area until the end of the Second World War, providing an asphalted runway of 1,553 metres (5,095 ft), another unsurfaced runway for gliding and destinations to most major European cities. It was heavily damaged during the war, yet partly reconstructed and used by the Allies as a secondary airport since visibility is less often obscured than at Düsseldorf Airport. The latter then developed into the large civil airport that it is now, while Essen/Mülheim now mainly serves occasional air traffic (some 33,000 passengers each year), the base of a fleet of airships and Germany's oldest public flight training company. Residents of the region around Essen typically use Düsseldorf Airport (about 20 driving minutes) and occasionally Dortmund Airport (about 30 driving minutes) for both domestic and international flights.

== Landmarks ==
=== Zollverein Industrial Complex ===
The Zollverein Coal Mine Industrial Complex is the city's most famous landmark. For decades, the coal mine (current form mainly from 1932, closed in 1986) and the coking plant (closed in 1993) ranked among the largest of their kinds in Europe. Shaft XII, built in Bauhaus style, with its characteristic winding tower, which over the years has become a symbol for the whole Ruhr area, is considered an architectural and technical masterpiece, earning it a reputation as the "most beautiful coal mine in the world". After UNESCO had declared it a World Heritage Site in 2001, the complex, which had lain idle for a long time and was even threatened to be demolished, began to see a period of redevelopment. Under the direction of an agency borne by the land of North Rhine-Westphalia and the city itself, several arts and design institutions settled mainly on the grounds of the former coal mine; a redevelopment plan for the coking plant is to be realised.

On the grounds of the coal mine and the coking plant, which are both accessible free of charge while paid guided tours (some with former Kumpels) are available, several tourist attractions can be found, most importantly the Design Zentrum NRW/Red Dot Design Museum. The Ruhrmuseum, a museum dedicated to the history of the Ruhr area, which had been existing since 1904, opened its gates as one of the anchor attractions in the former coal-washing facility in 2010.

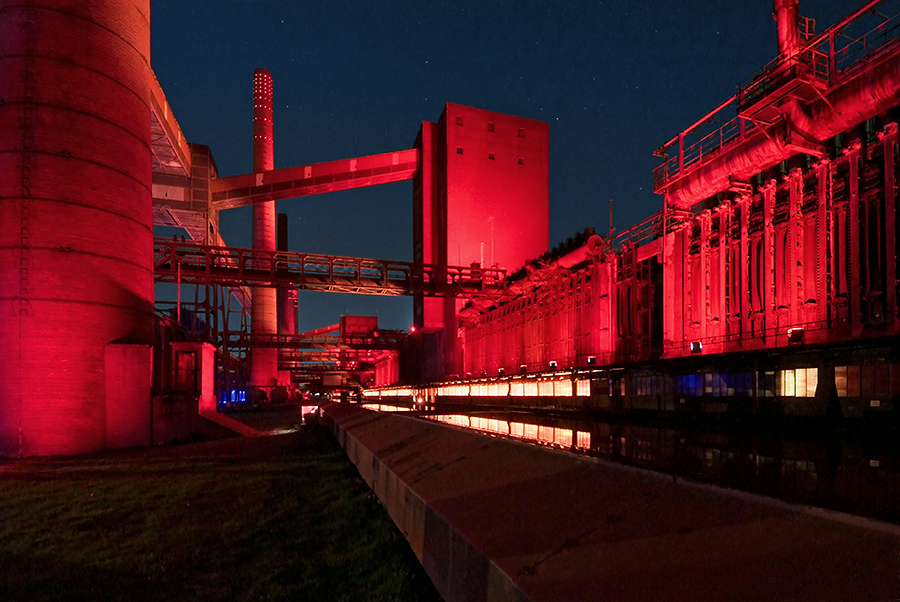
Coal mine Zollverein

Shaft XII of Zollverein

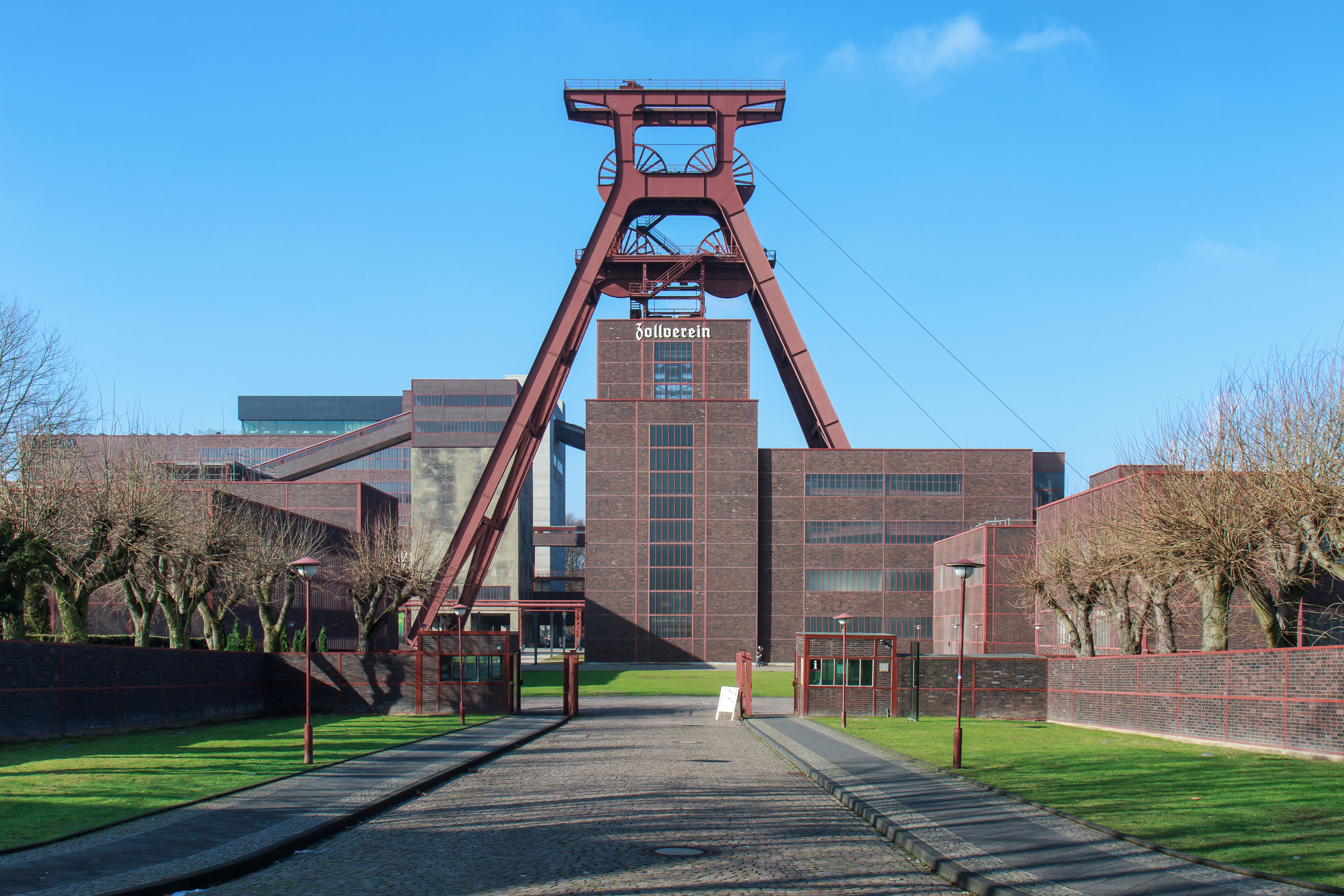
Zollverein entrance

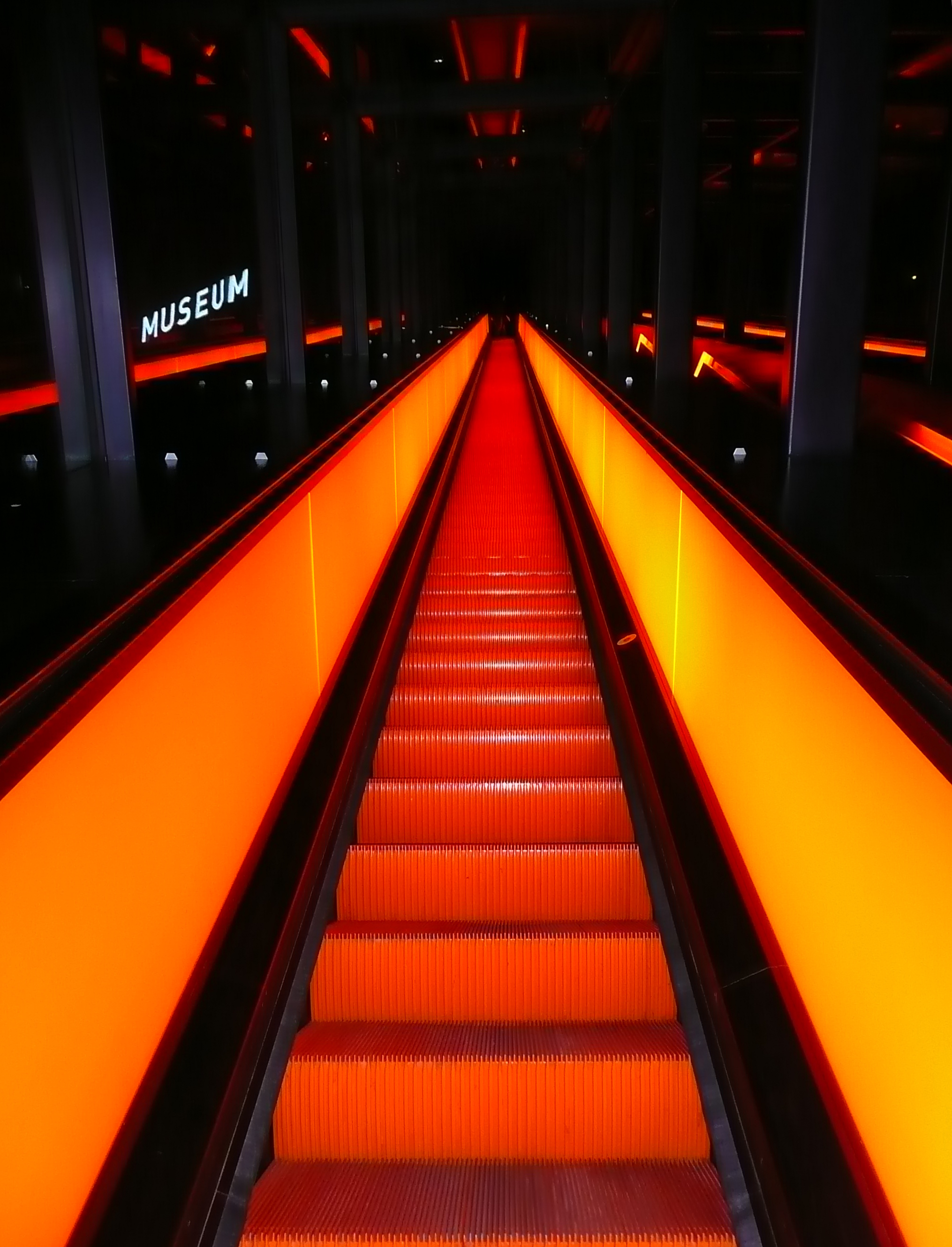
Ruhrmuseum

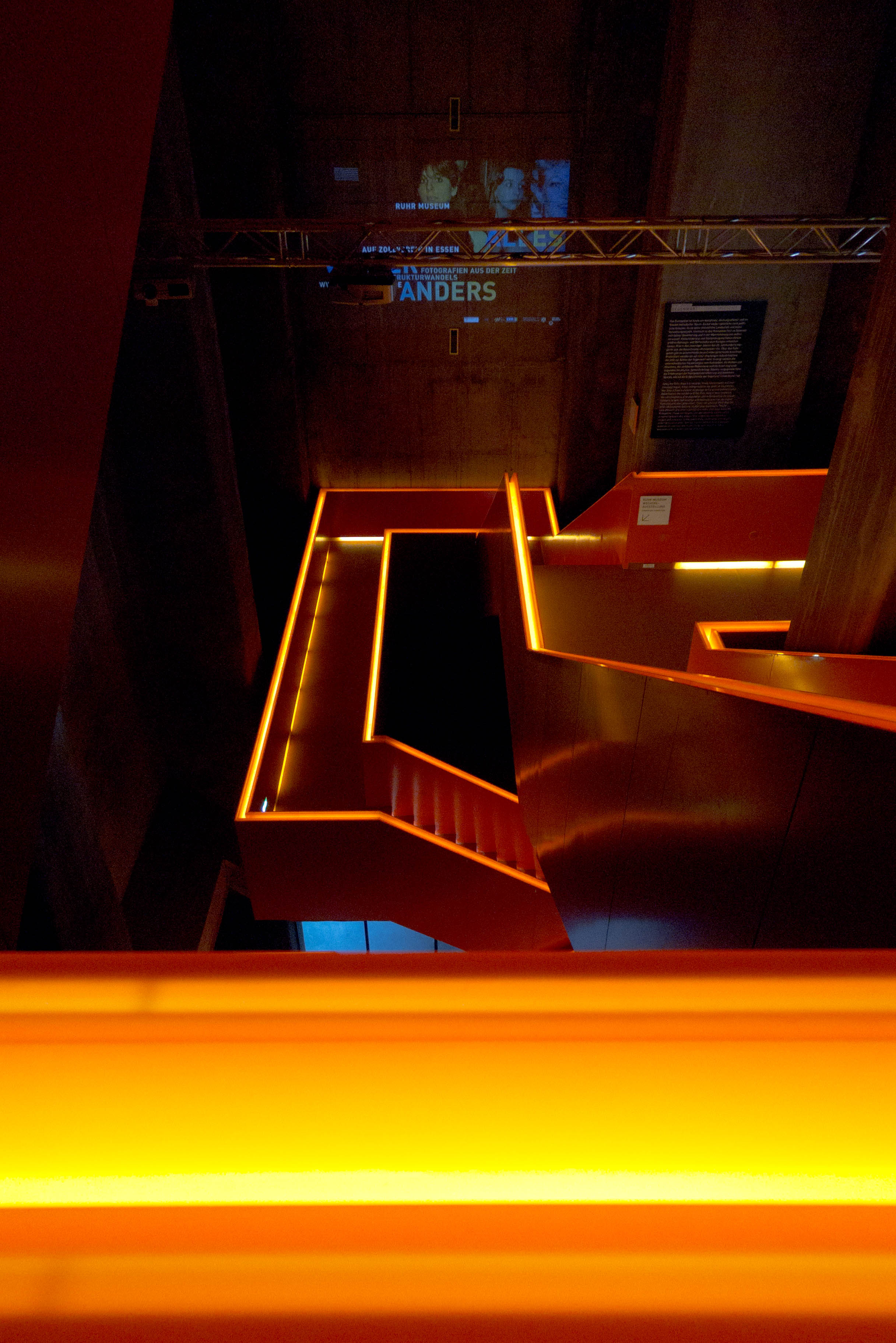
Ruhrmuseum staircase

=== Essen Minster and treasury ===
The former collegiate church of Essen Abbey and nowadays cathedral of the Bishop of Essen is a Gothic hall church made from light sandstone. The first church on the premises dates back to between 845 and 870; the current church was constructed after a former church had burnt down in 1275. However, the important westwork and crypt have survived from Ottonian times. The cathedral is located in the centre of the city which evolved around it. It is not spectacular in appearance and the adjacent church St. Johann Baptist, which is located directly within the pedestrian precinct, is often mistakenly referred to as the cathedral. The cathedral treasury, however, ranks amongst the most important in Germany since only few art works have been lost over the centuries. The most precious exhibit, located within the cathedral, is the Golden Madonna of Essen (around 980), the oldest known sculpture of the Madonna and the oldest free-standing sculpture north of the Alps. Other exhibits include the alleged child crown of Emperor Otto III, the eldest preserved seven-branched Christian candelabrum and several other art works from Ottonian times.

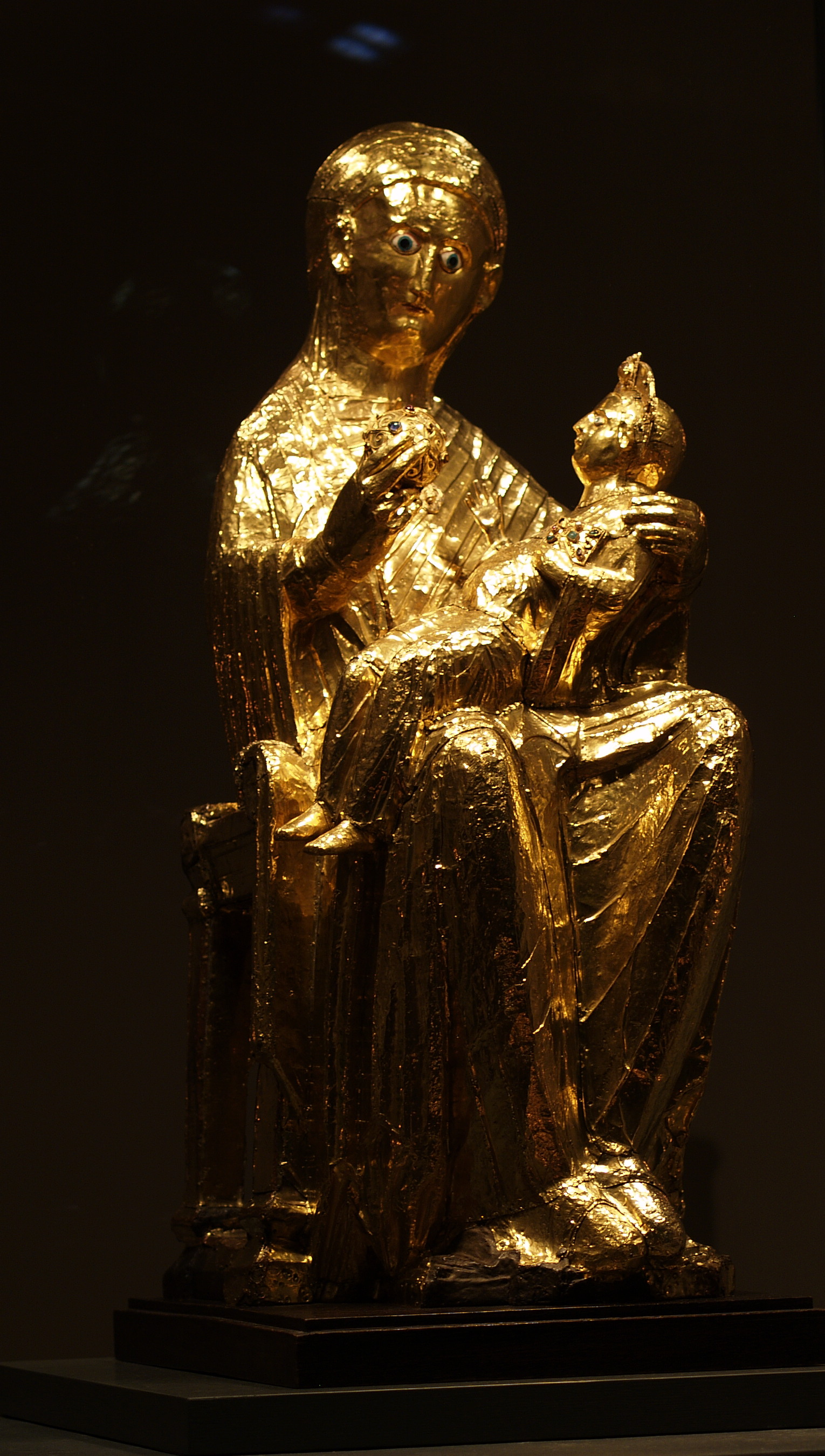
Golden Madonna of Essen

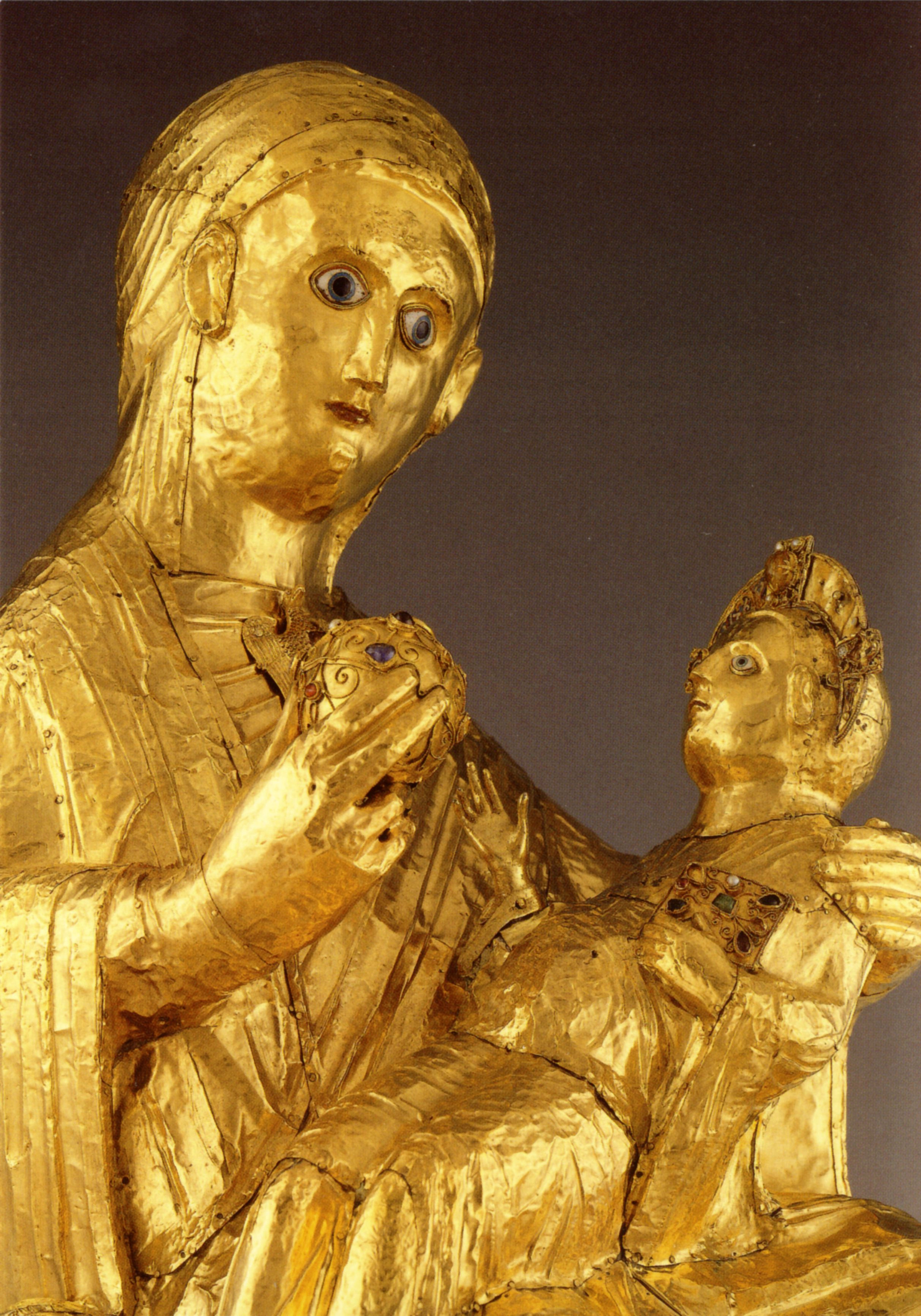
Golden Madonna of Essen

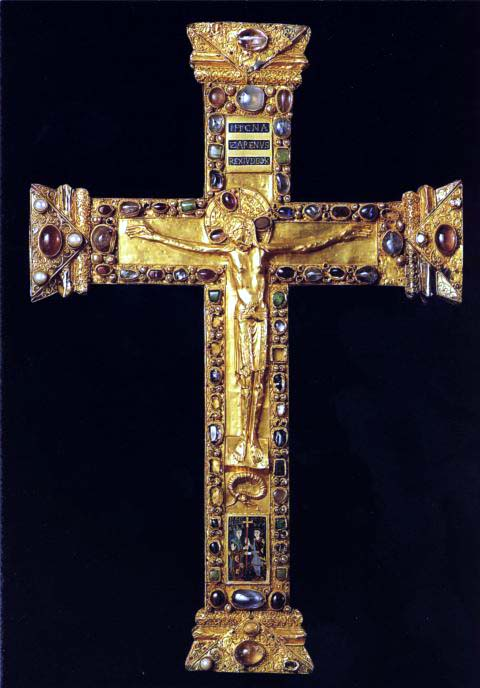
Cross of Otto and Mathilde, tenth century

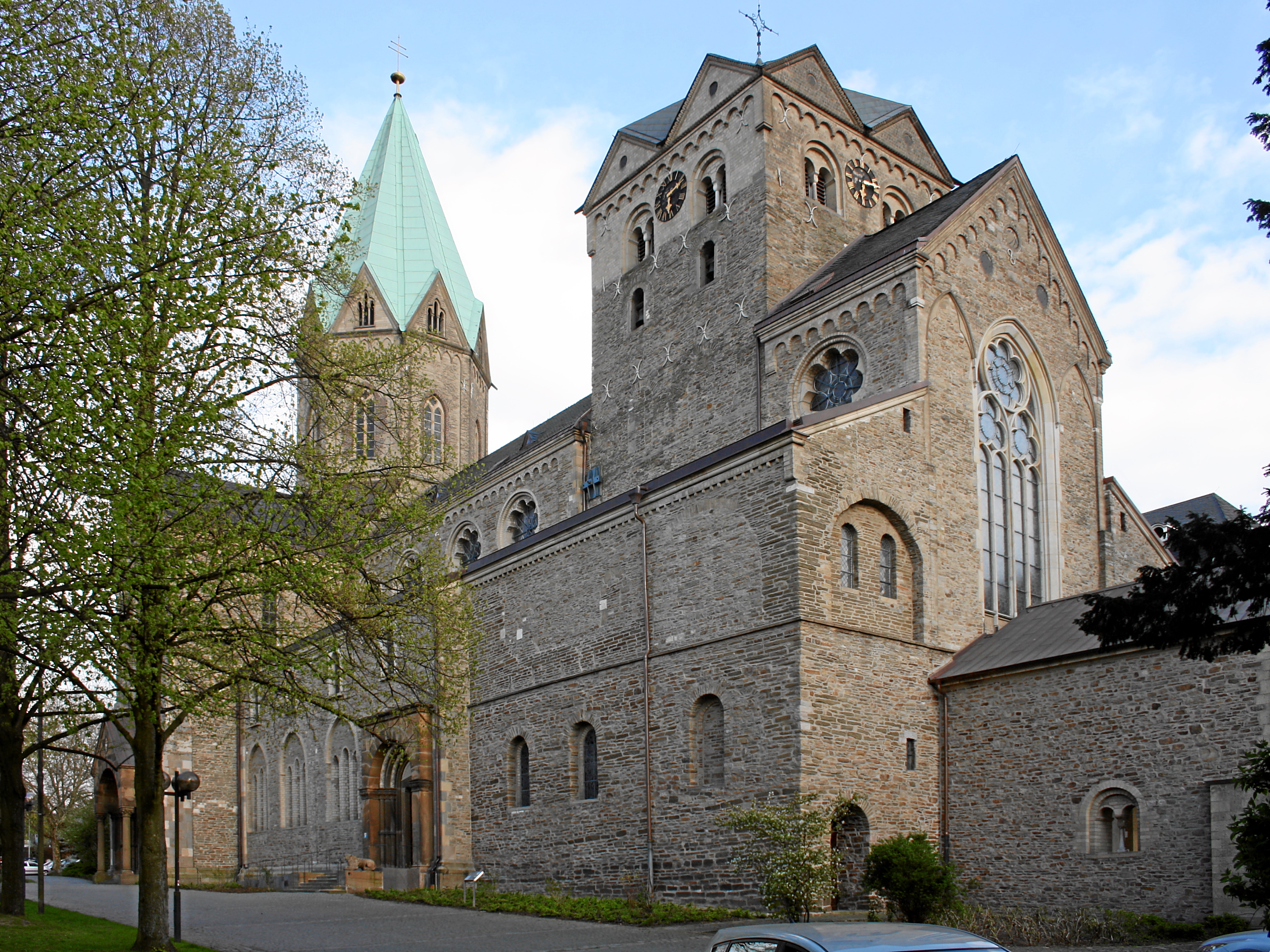
St. Ludger Basilica

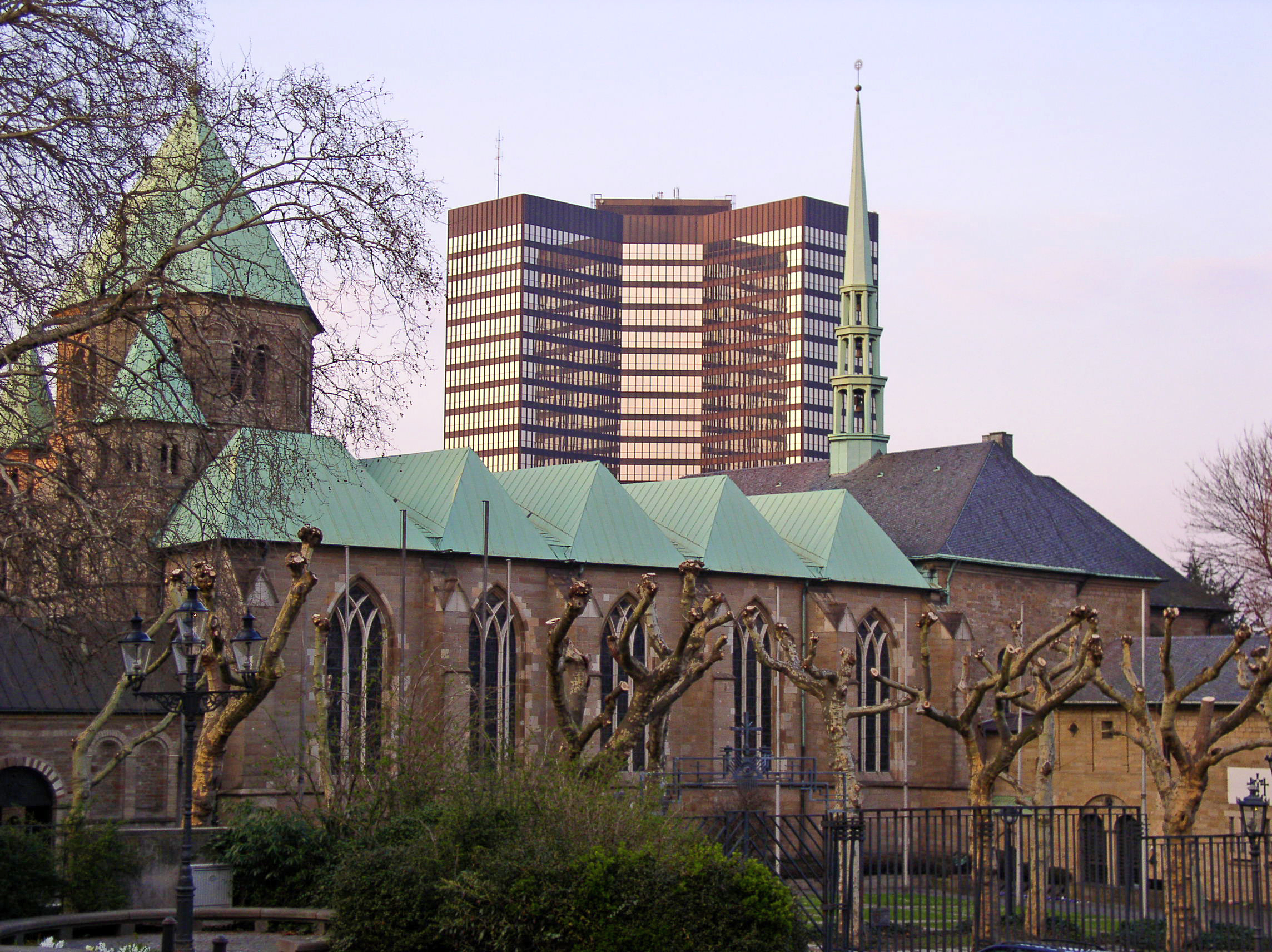
Essen Minster overshadowed by the town hall

=== Old Synagogue ===
Opened in 1913, the then-New Synagogue served as the central meeting place of Essen's pre-war Jewish community. The building ranks as one of the largest and most impressive testimonies of Jewish culture in pre-war Germany. In post-war Germany, following the genocidal reduction of the Jewish population during the Holocaust, the former house of worship was bought by the city, used as an exhibition hall, and later rededicated as a cultural meeting centre and house of Jewish culture.

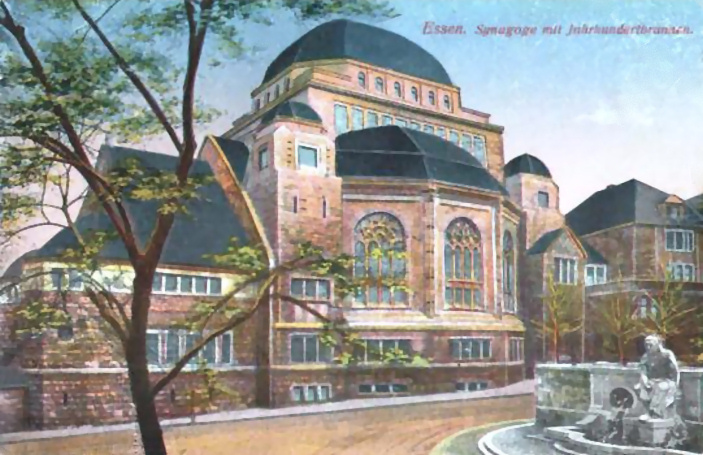
Synagogue, 1917

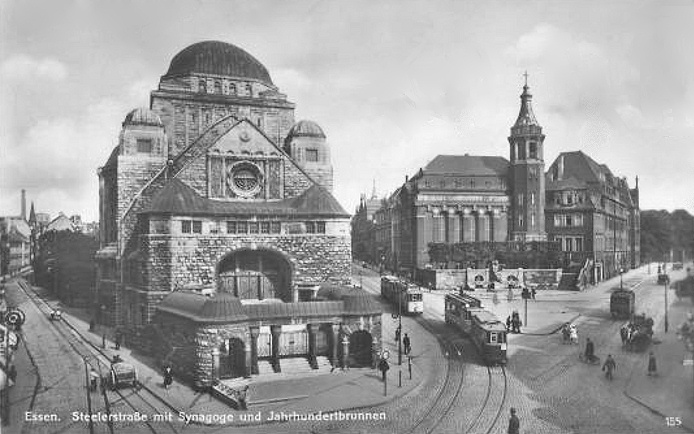
Synagogue, 1922

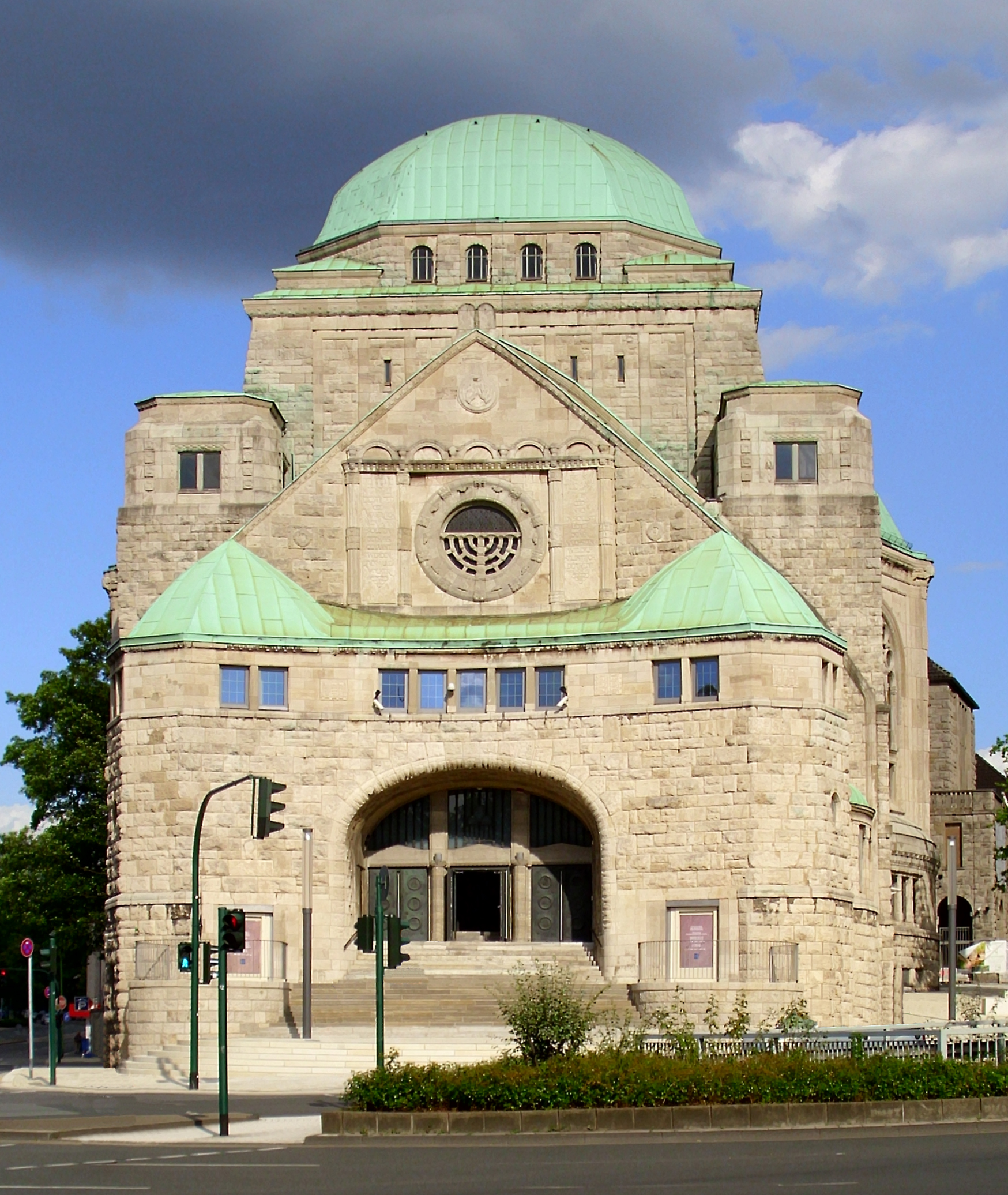
Old Synagogue, 2010

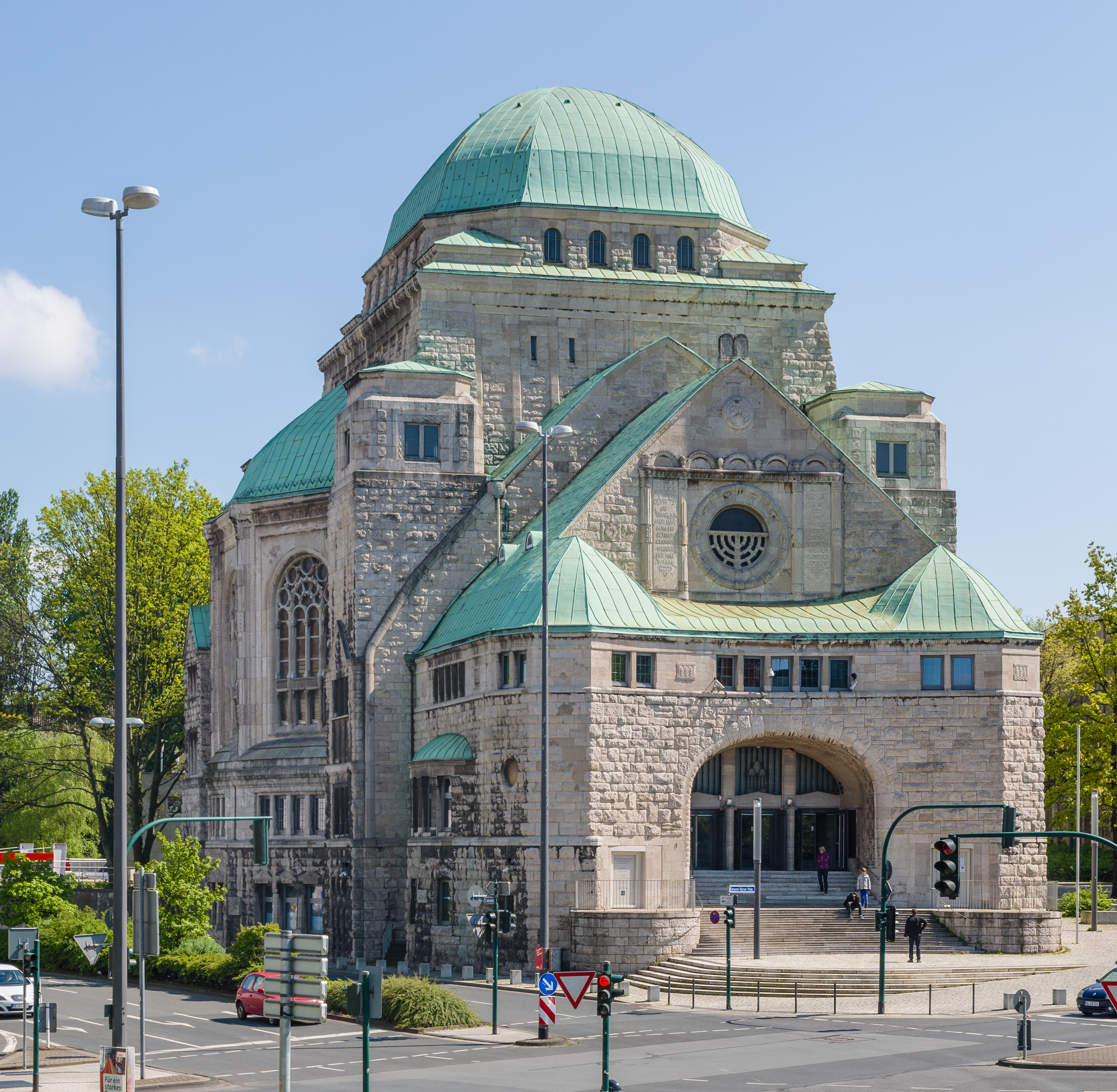
Old Synagogue, 2014

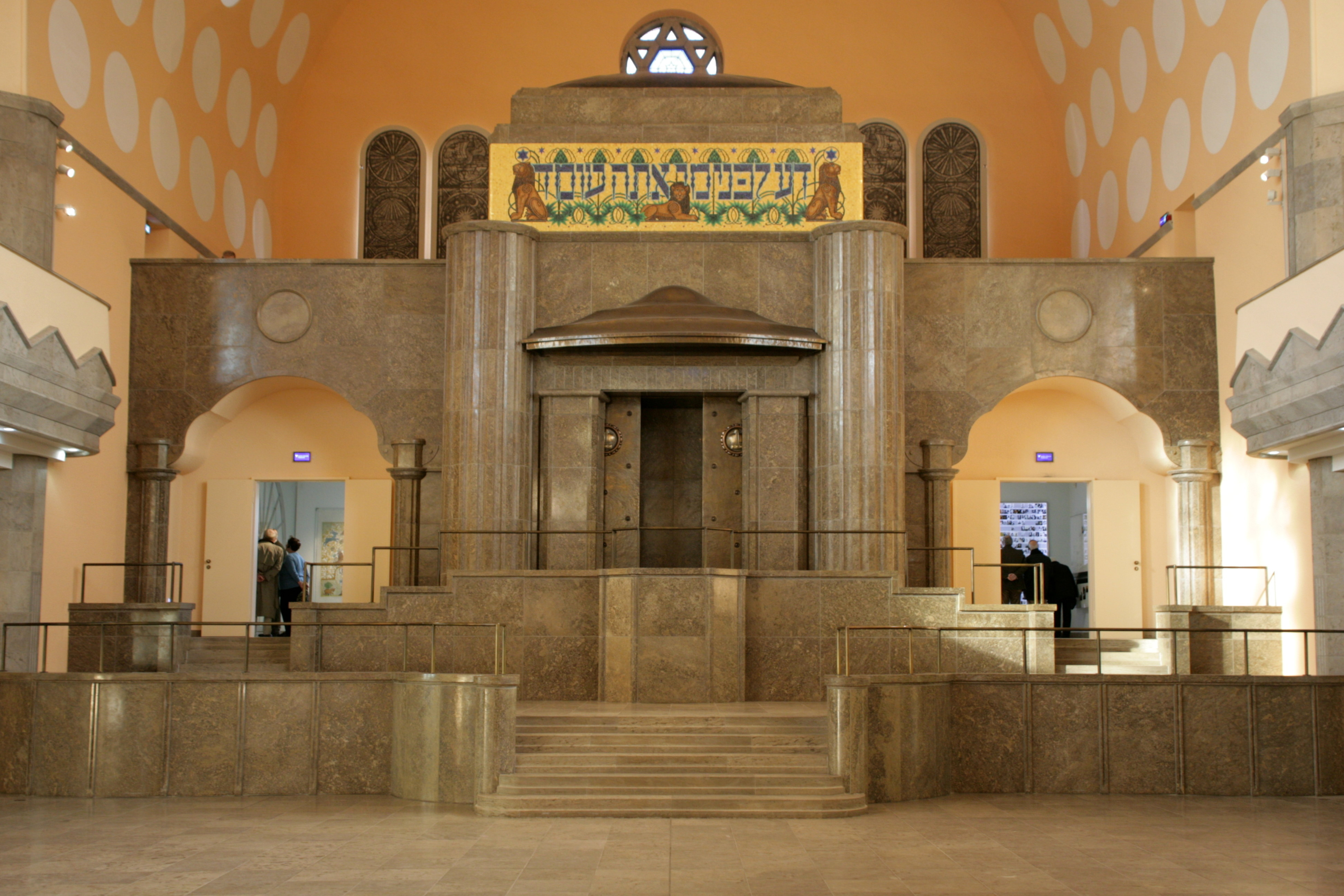
Old Synagogue interior

=== Villa Hügel ===
Built in 1873 by industrial magnate Alfred Krupp, Villa Hügel, the 269-room mansion (8,100 m^{2} or 87,190 sq ft) and the surrounding park of 28 ha (69.2 acres) served as the Krupp family's representative seat. The city's land register solely lists the property, which at times had a staff of up to 640 people, as a single-family home. At the time of its construction, the villa featured some technical novelties and peculiarities, such as a central hot air heating system, own water- and gas works and electric internal and external telegraph- and telephone systems (with a central induction alarm for the staff). The mansion's central clock became the reference clock for the whole Krupp enterprise; every clock was to be set with a maximum difference of half a minute. It even acquired its own railway station, Essen Hügel, which is still a regular stop. The Krupp family had to leave the Gründerzeit mansion in 1945, when it was annexed by the allies. Given back in 1952, Villa Hügel is now seat of the Alfried Krupp von Bohlen und Halbach Foundation (major shareholder of Thyssen-Krupp) and was opened for concerts and sporadic yet high-profile exhibitions.

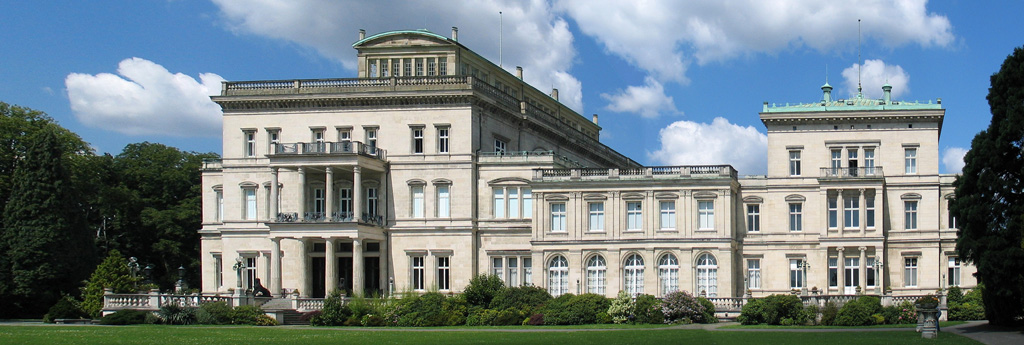
Villa Hügel

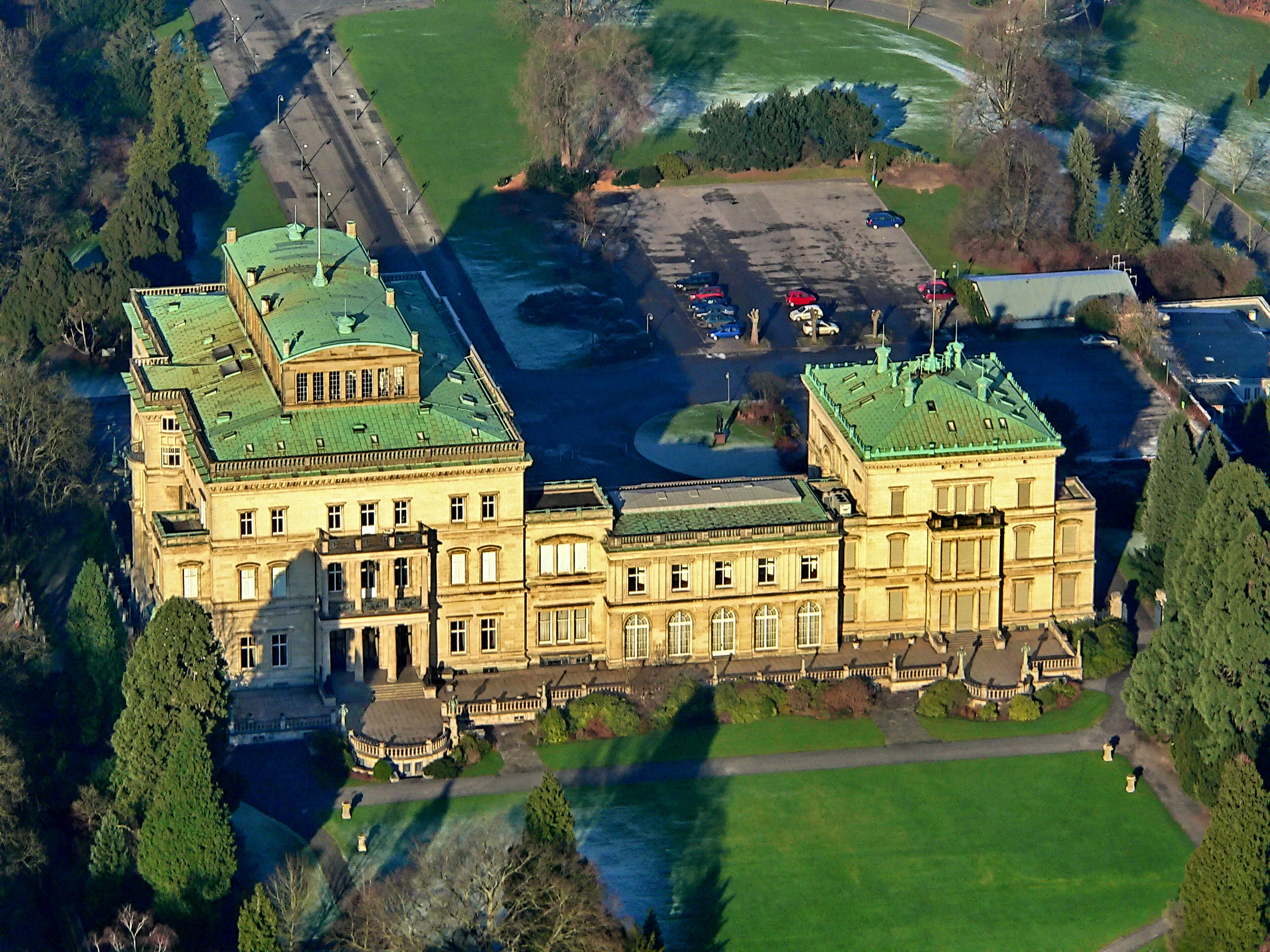
Villa Hügel

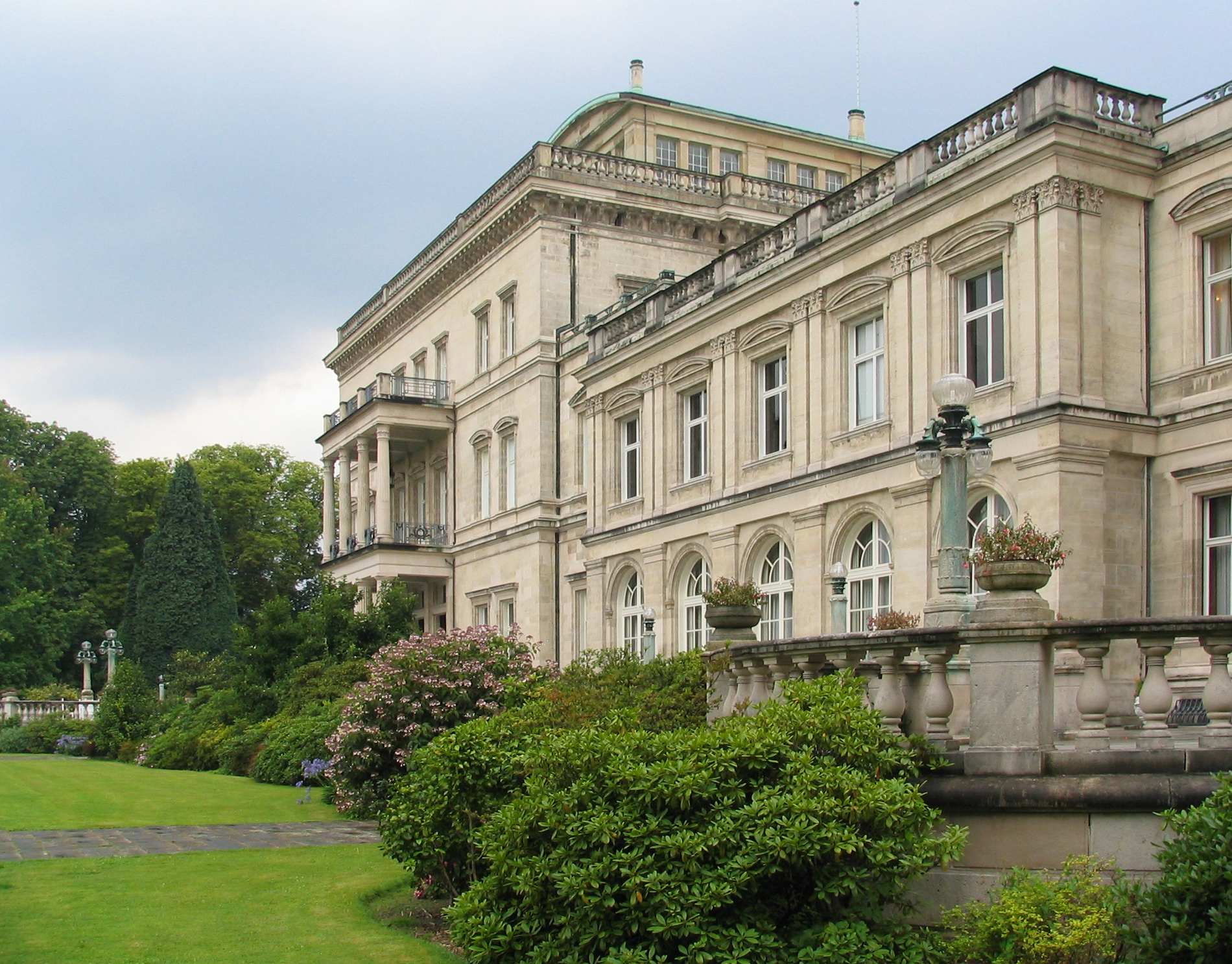
Villa Hügel

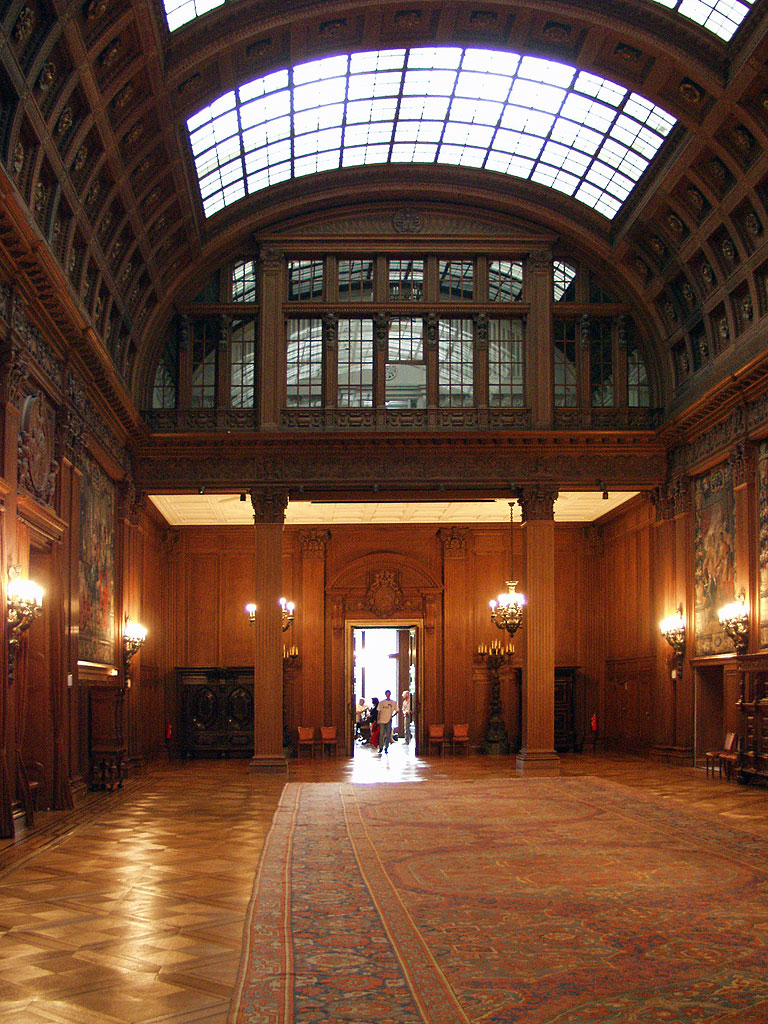
Great hall

=== Kettwig and Werden ===
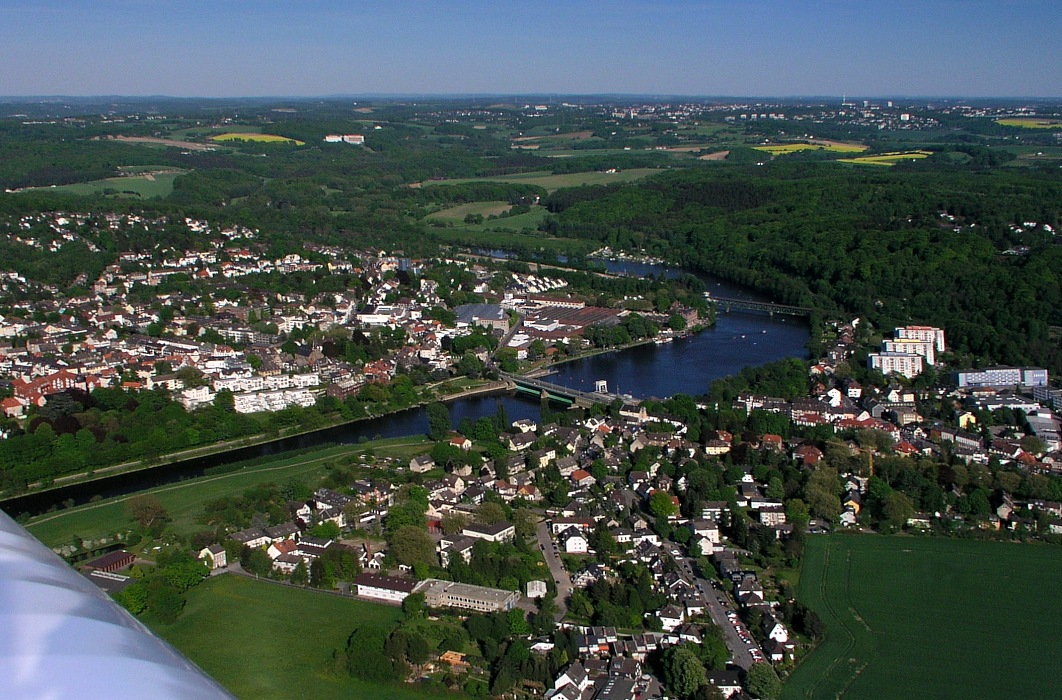
Borough of Kettwig, annexed in 1975. Despite its industrial history, Essen is generally regarded as one of Germany's greenest cities.

In the south of the city, the boroughs of Kettwig and Werden exceptionally stand for towns once of their own, which have been annexed in 1929 (Werden) and 1975 (Kettwig), respectively, and which have largely preserved their pre-annexation character. While most of the northern boroughs were heavily damaged during the Second World War and often lost their historic town centres; the more southern parts got off more lightly.

In Werden, St. Ludger founded Werden Abbey around 799, 45 years before St. Altfrid founded the later cornerstone of the modern city, Essen Abbey. The old church of Werden abbey, St. Ludgerus, was designated a papal basilica minor in 1993, while the main building of the former abbey today is the headquarters of the Folkwang University of music and performing arts.

Kettwig, which was annexed in 1975, much to the dismay of the population that still struggles for independence, was mainly shaped by the textile industry. The most southern borough of Essen is also the city's largest (with regard to area) and presumably greenest.

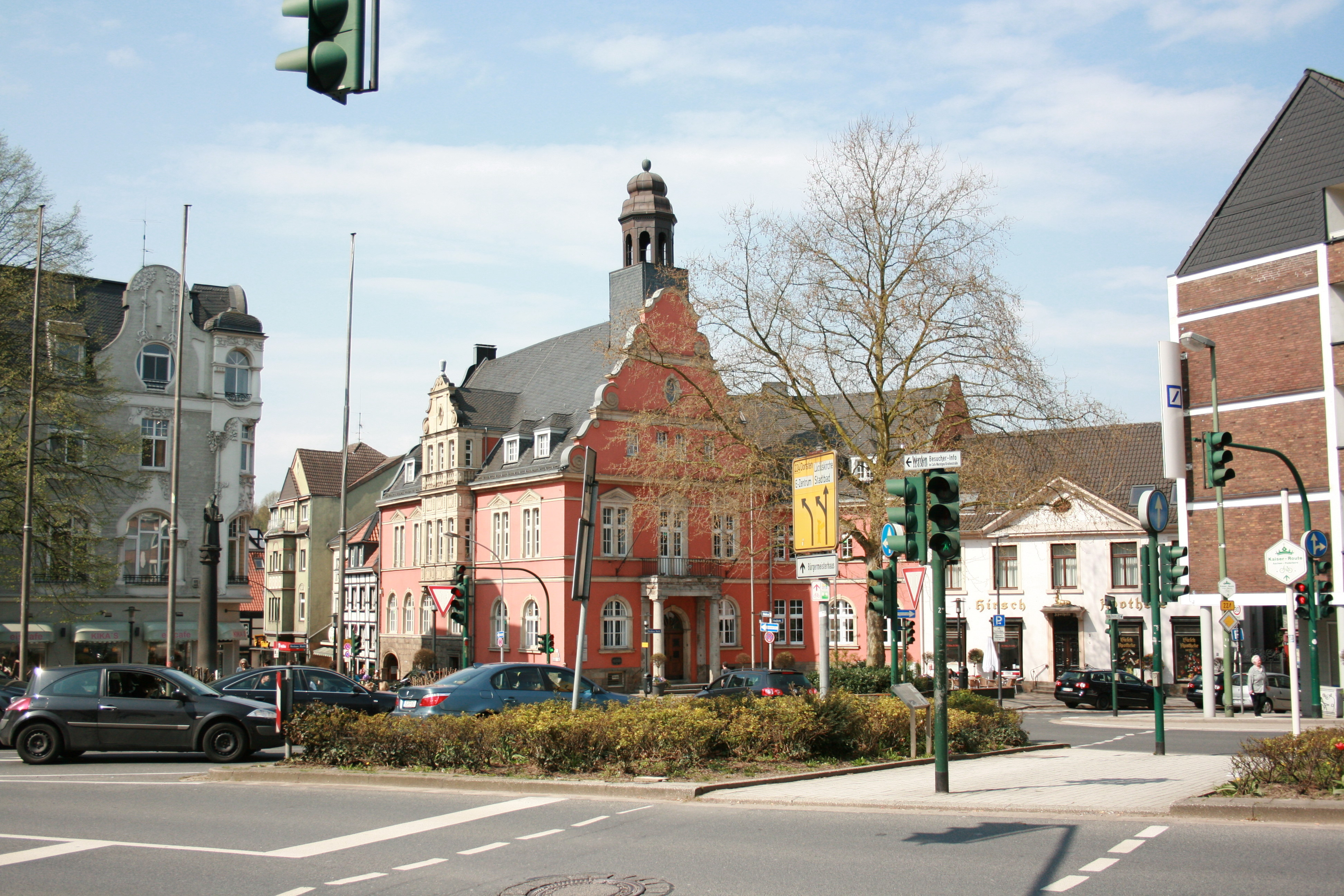
Essen Werden

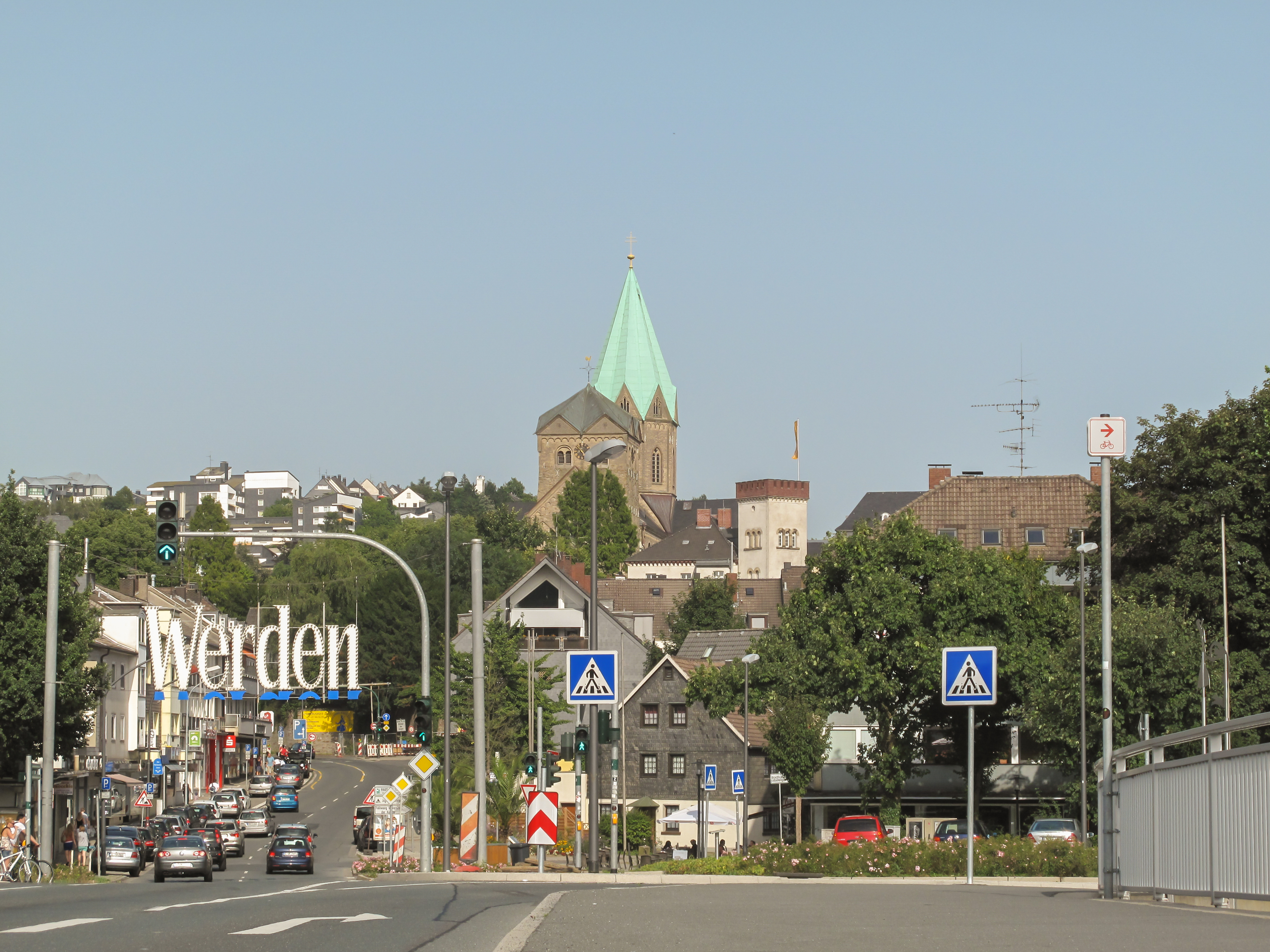
Essen Werden

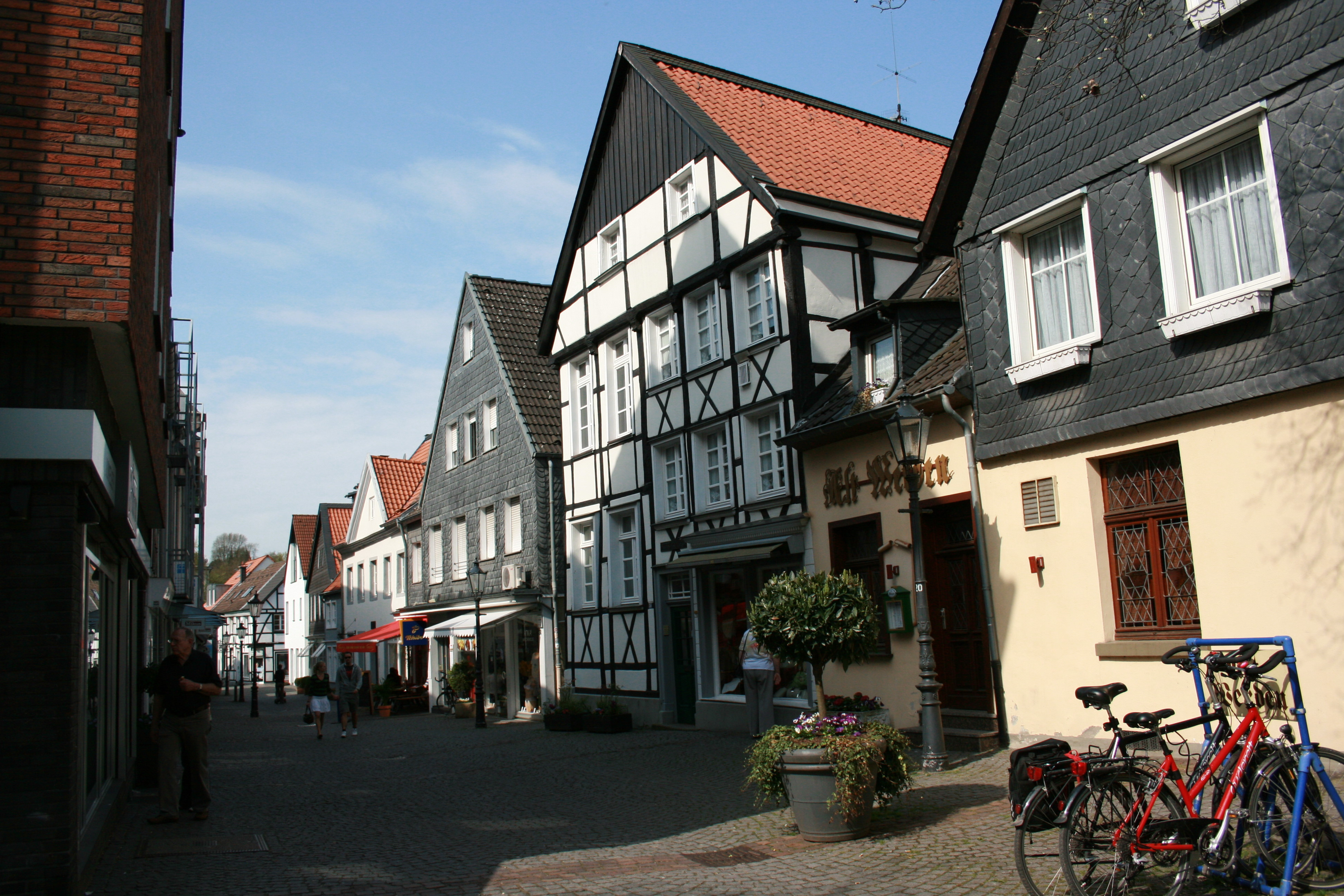
Essen Werden historic town centre

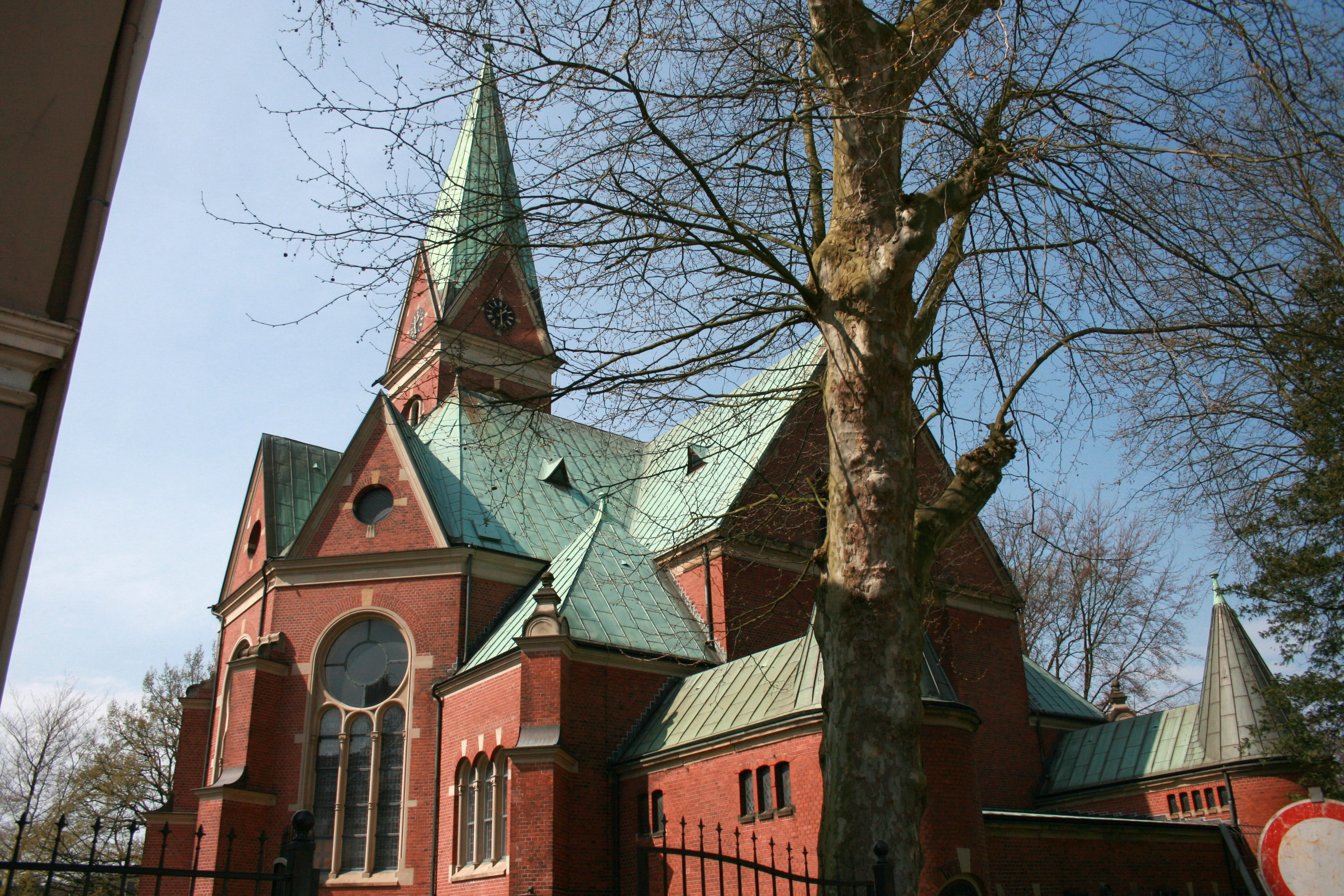
Protestant church Essen Werden

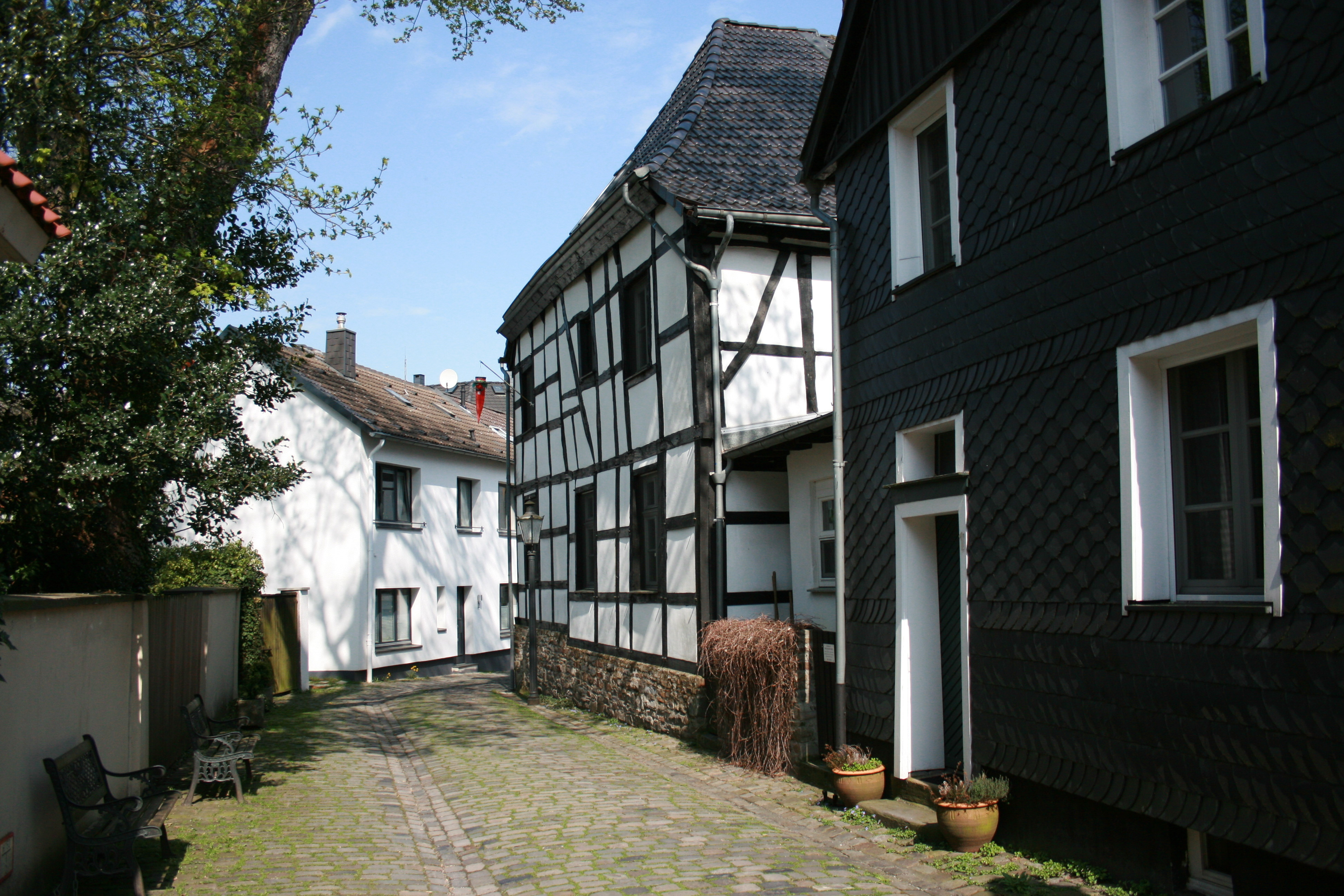
Essen Werden

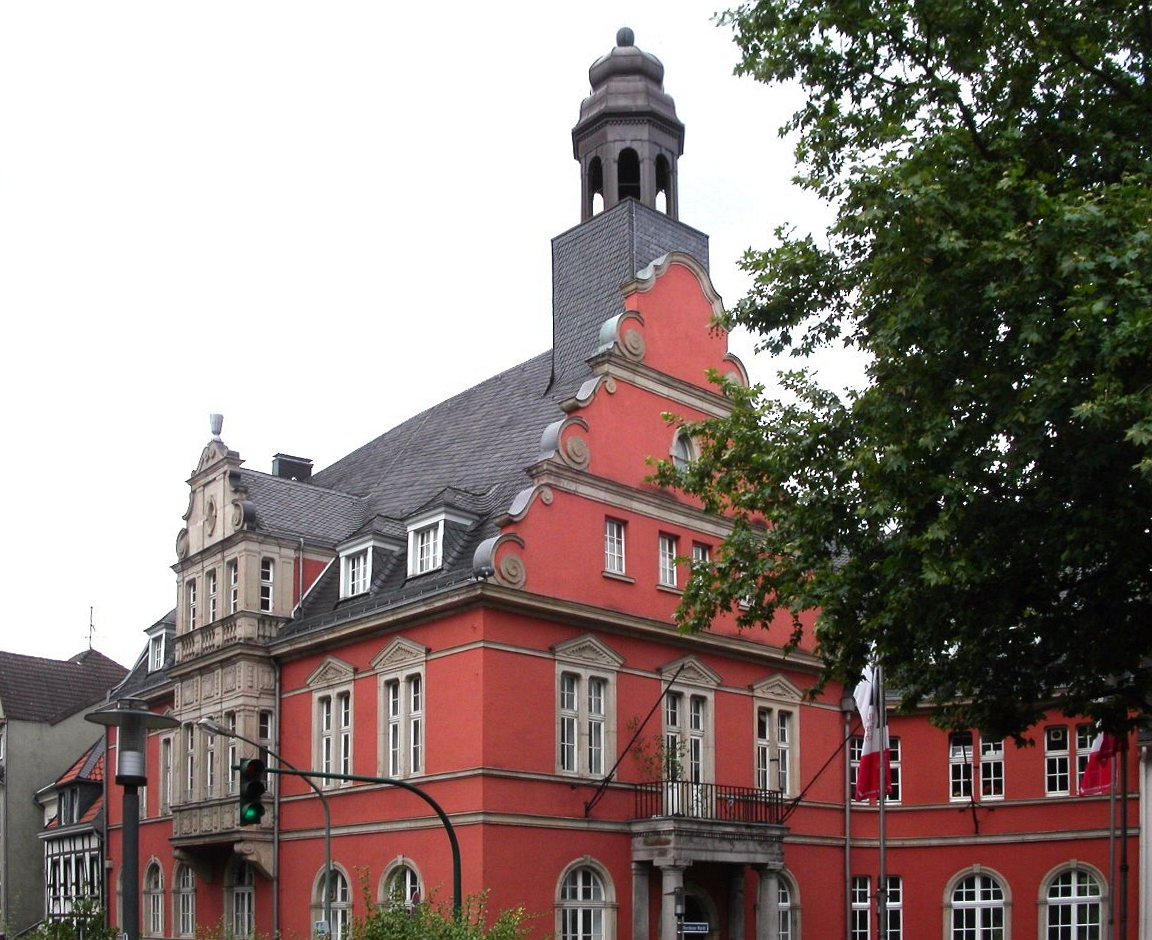
Essen Werden, old town hall

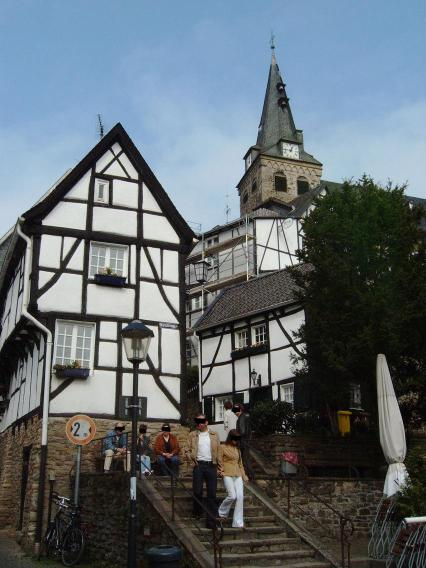
Historic town centre of Kettwig

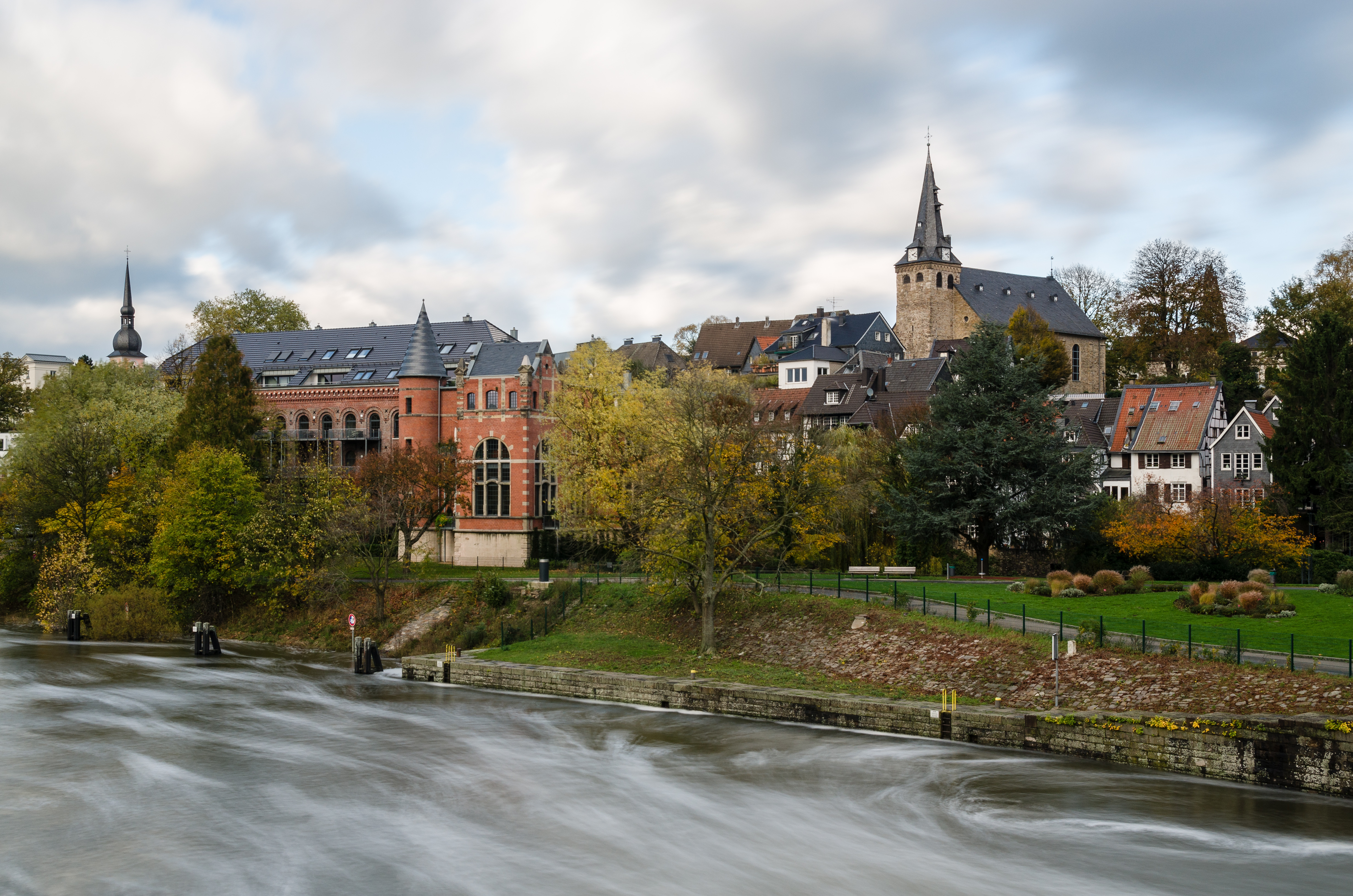
Essen Kettwig

=== Other important cultural sites ===
- Museum Folkwang: One of the Ruhr area's major art collections, mainly from the 19th and 20th centuries. Major parts of the museum have recently been rebuilt and expanded according to plans by David Chipperfield & Co. The Alfried Krupp von Bohlen und Halbach Foundation is the sole funder of the €55 million project which was completed in early 2010. After its re-opening, it also hosts the collection of the Deutsches Plakat Museum (more than 340 000 exhibits).
- Aalto Theatre: Opened in 1988 (the plans dating back to 1959), the asymmetric building with its deep indigo interior is home to the acclaimed Essen Opera and Ballet.
- Saalbau Essen: Home of the Essen Philharmonic Orchestra, completely renovated in 2003/2004. Critics have repeatedly voted the Essen Philharmonic as Germany's Orchestra of the Year.
- Colosseum Theater: Situated in a former Krupp factory building at the fringe of the central pedestrian precinct, the Colosseum Theater has been home to several musical theatre productions since 1996.
- Zeche Carl, a former coal mine, now a cultural centre and venue for Rock concerts and home of Offener Kanal Essen.
- Grillo-Theater, a theatre in the centre of the city.
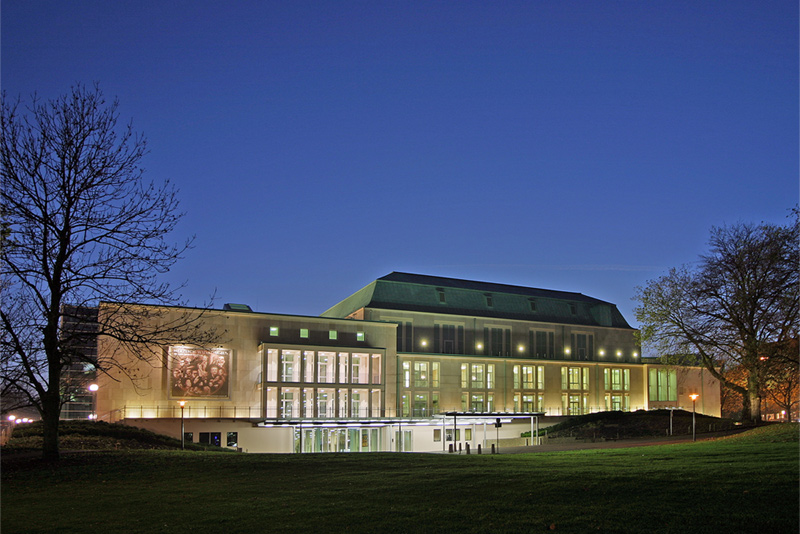
Saalbau Essen

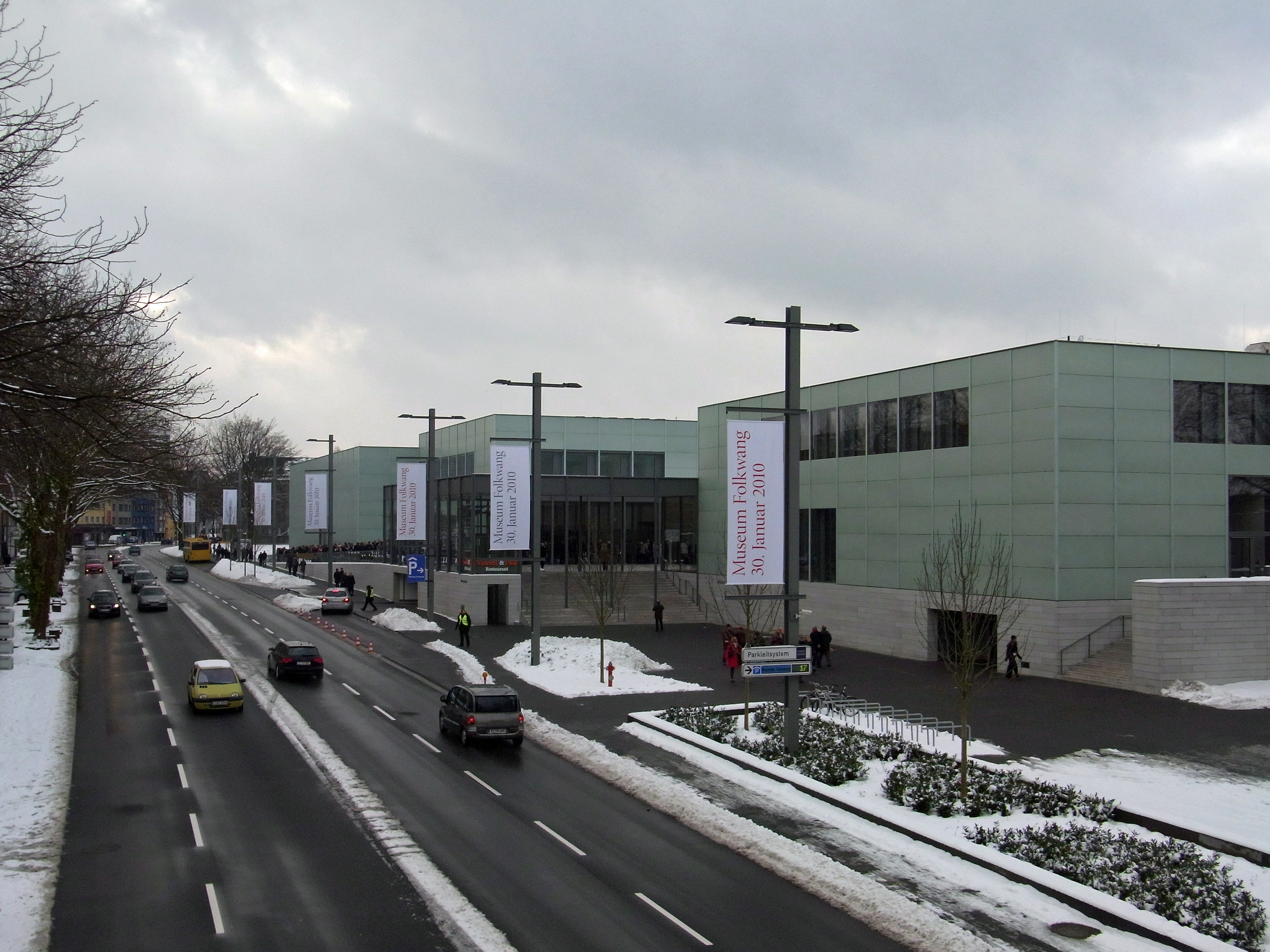
Museum Folkwang

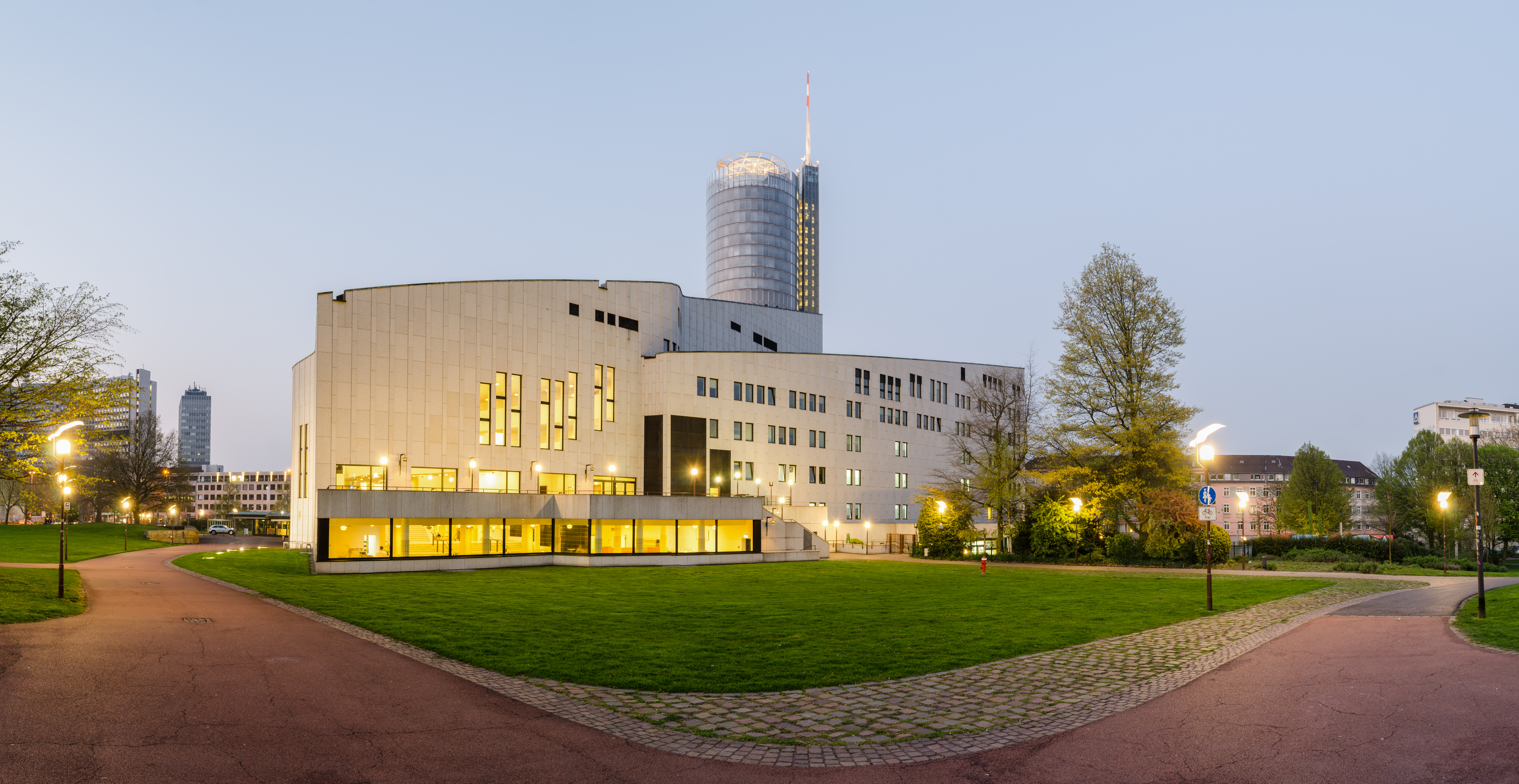
Aalto Theatre

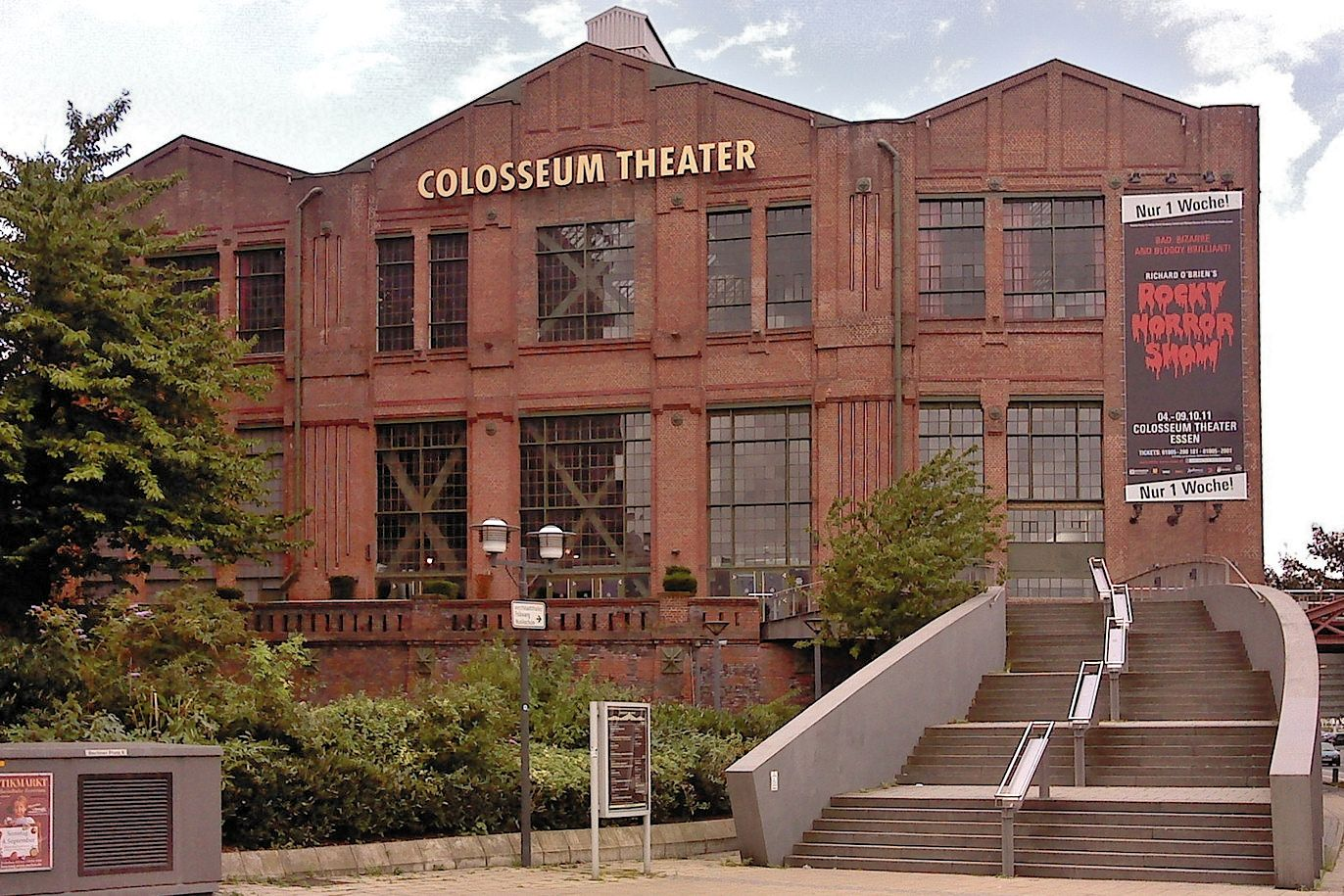
Colosseum Theater

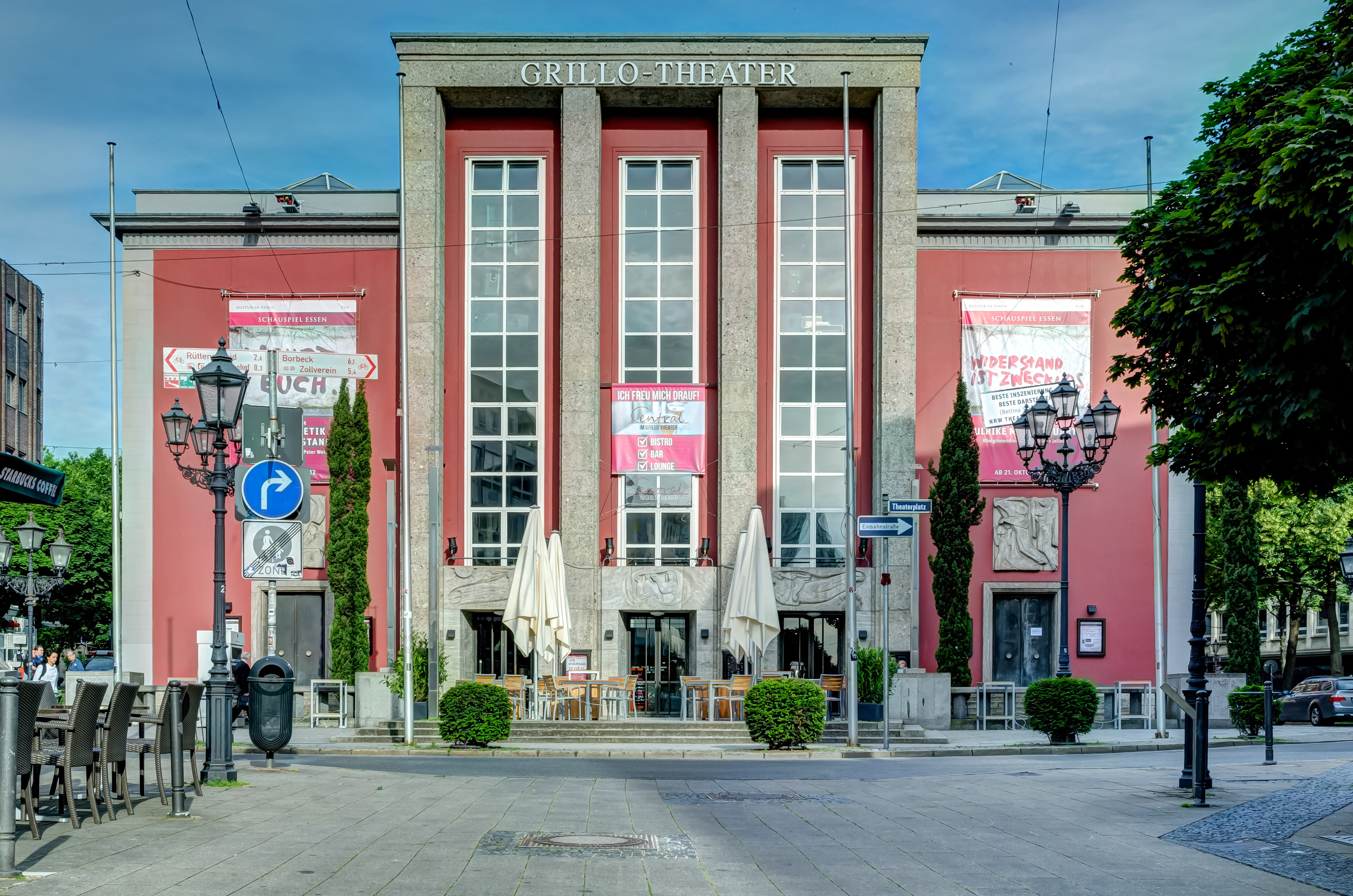
Grillo-Theater

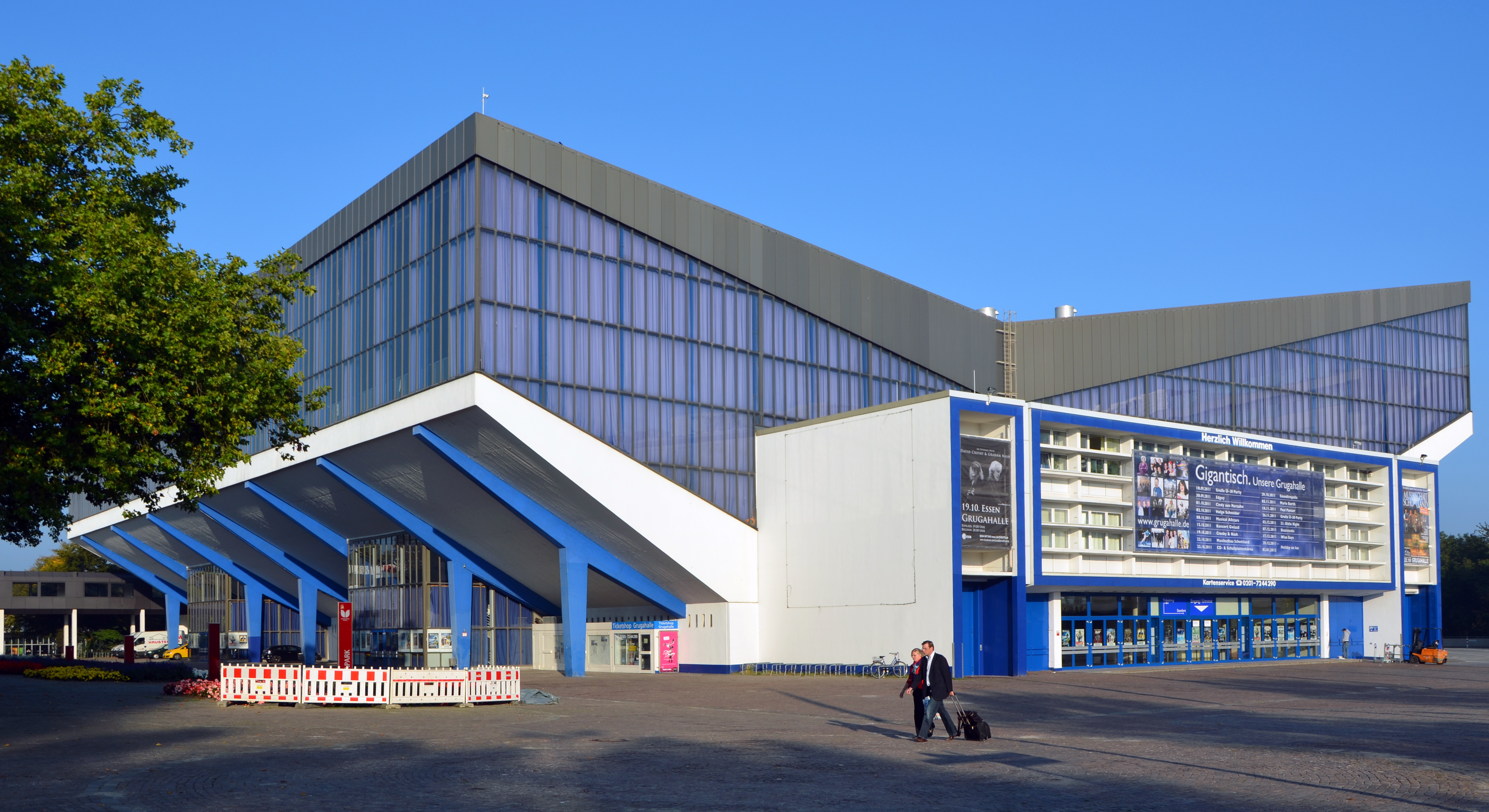
Grugahalle concert hall

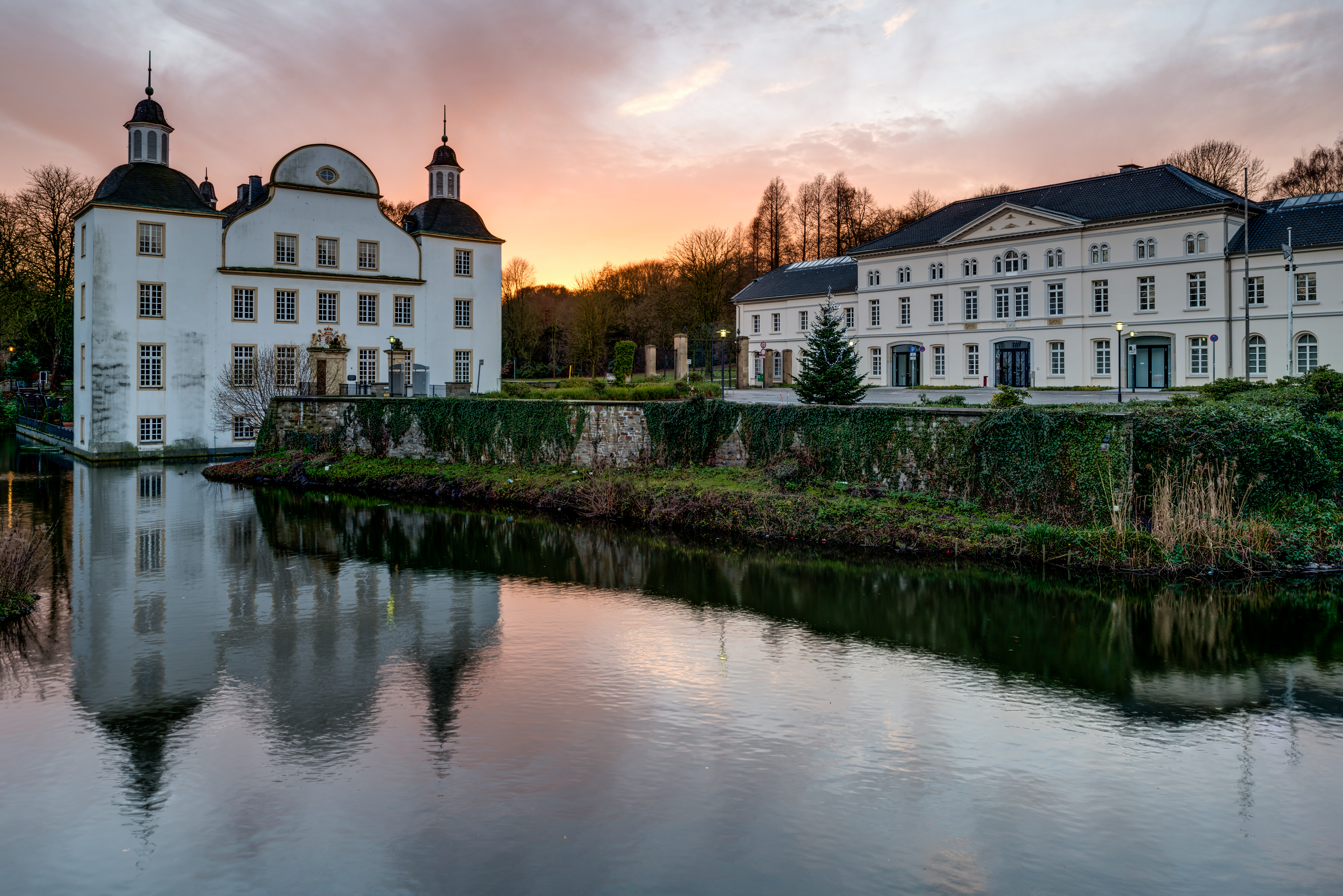
Schloss Borbeck

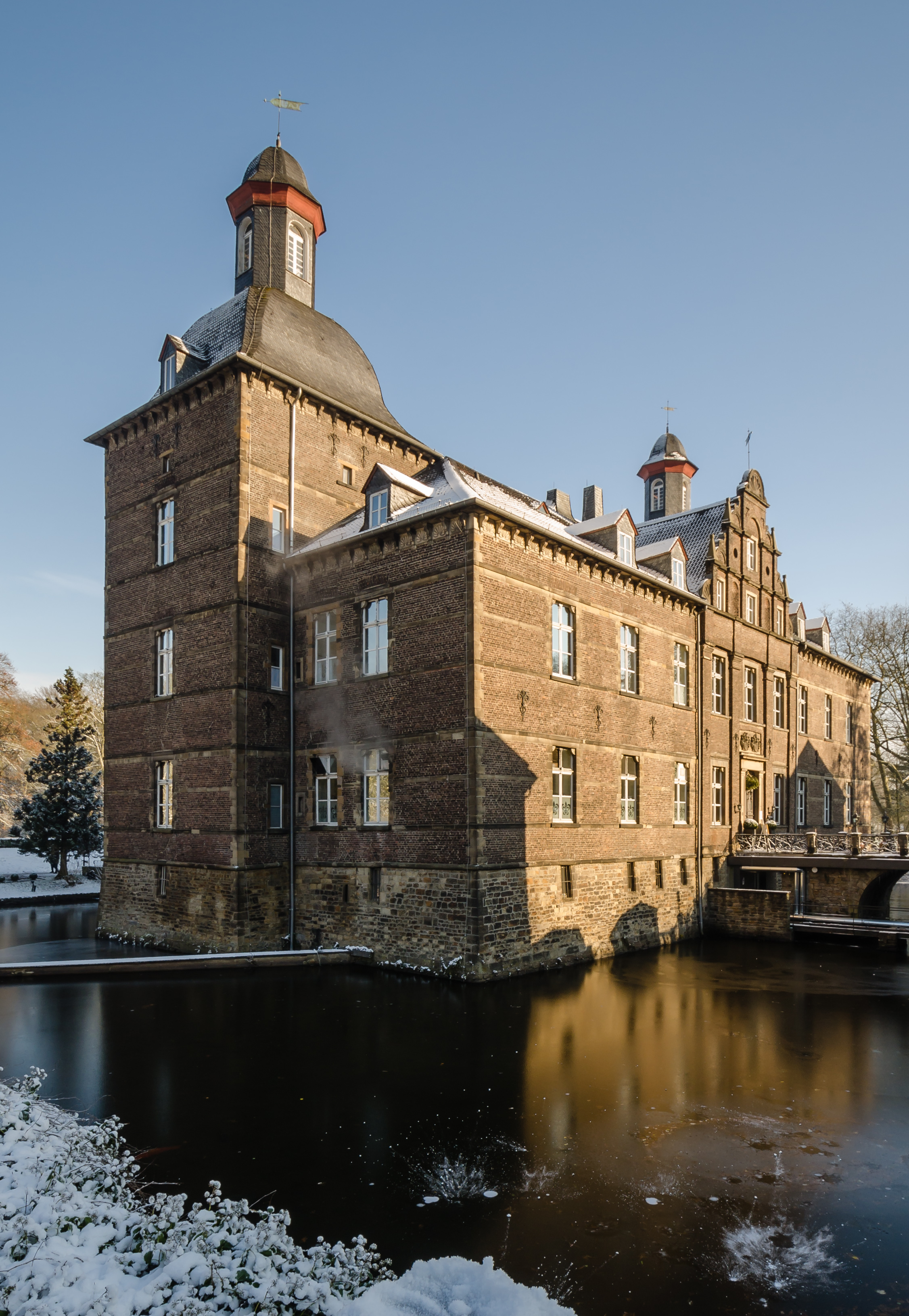
Hugenpoet castle

=== Other sites ===
- Gartenstadt Margarethenhöhe: Founded by Margarethe Krupp in 1906, the garden city with its 3092 units in 935 buildings on an area of 115 ha (284.2 acres) (of which 50 ha are woodland) is considered the first of its kind in Germany. All buildings follow the same stylistic concept, with slight variations for each one. Although originally designed as an area for the lower classes with quite small flats, the old part Margarethenhöhe I has developed into a middle class residential area and housing space has become highly sought after. A new part, Margarehenhöhe II, was built in the 1960s and 1970s but is architecturally inferior and especially the multi-storey buildings are still considered social hot spots.
- Moltkeviertel (Moltke Quarter): from 1908 on, following reformative plans of the city deputy Robert Schmidt, this quarter was developed just south-east of the city centre. Large green zones, forming broad urban ventilation lanes and incorporating sporting and playing areas and high quality architecture – invariably in the style of Reform Architecture, combine to create a unique example worldwide of modern town planning. It reflects reformative ideas and dates from the early part of the 20th century. The Moltkeviertel continues to be a much sought-after area for residential, educational, health care and small-scale commercial purposes. On the Moltkeplatz, the quarter's largest square, an ensemble of high quality contemporary art is maintained and cared for by local residents.
- Grugapark: With a total area of 70 ha (173.0 acres), the park near the exhibition halls is one of the largest urban parks in Germany and, although entry is not free of charge, one of the most popular recreational sites of the city. It includes the city's botanical garden, the Botanischer Garten Grugapark.
- Baldeneysee: The largest of the six reservoirs of the River Ruhr, situated in the south of the city, is another popular recreational area. It is used for sailing, rowing and ship tours. The hilly and only lightly developed forest area around the lake, from which the Kettwig area is easily reachable, is popular with hikers.
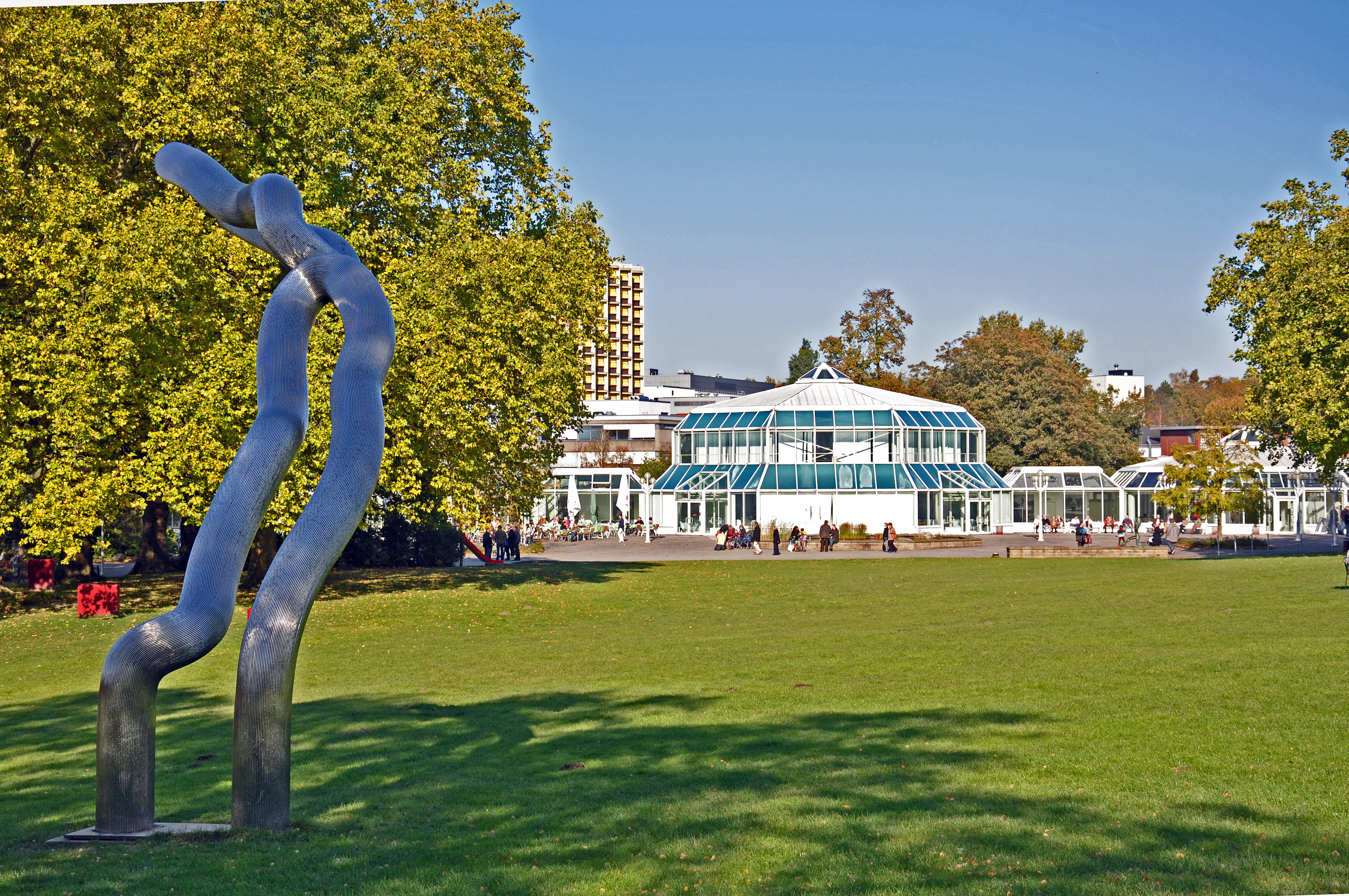
Grugapark, Kranichwiese facing the Orangerie and the sculpture Orion

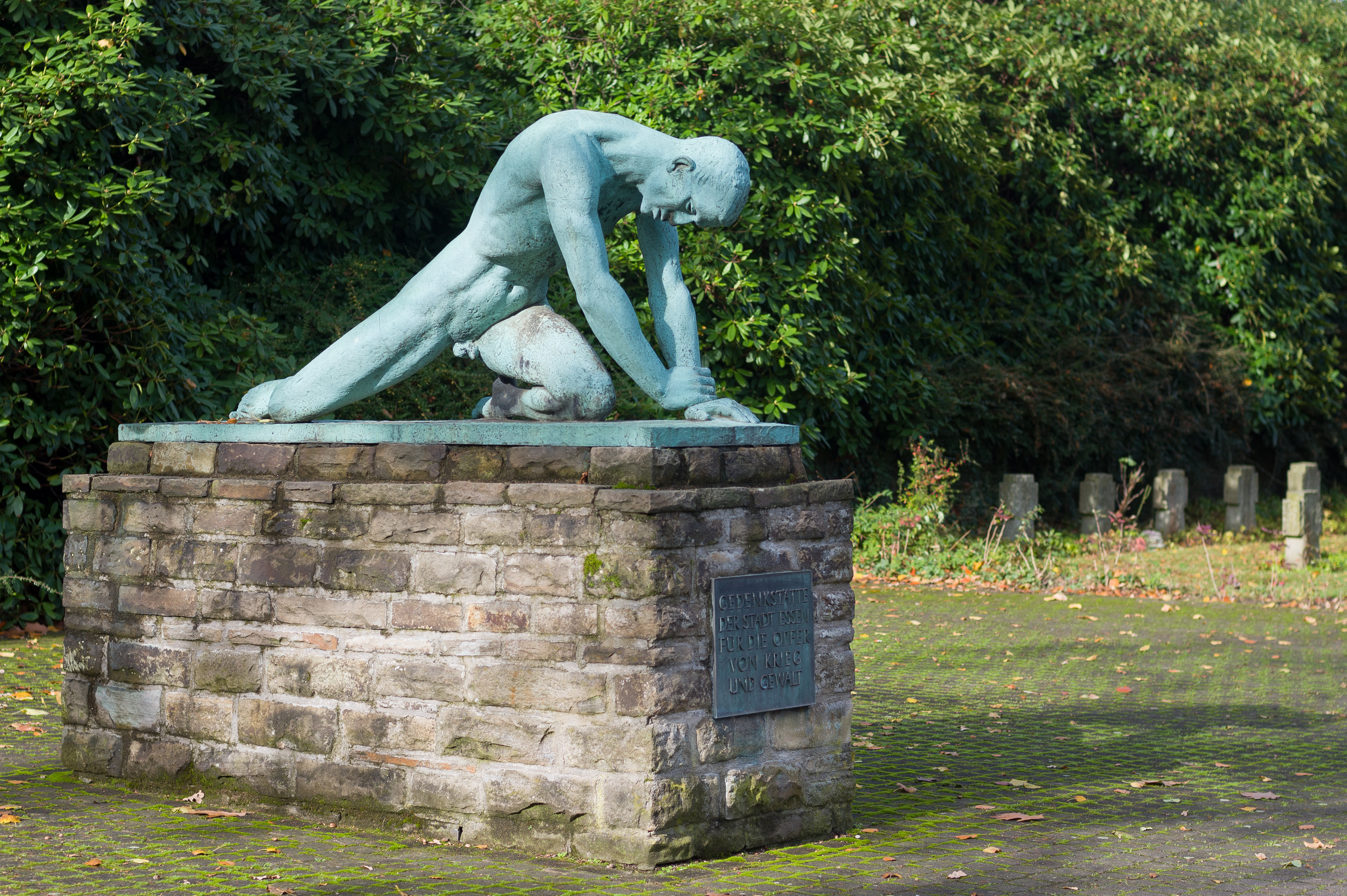
Grugapark, Sculpture "Trauer" by Joseph Enseling

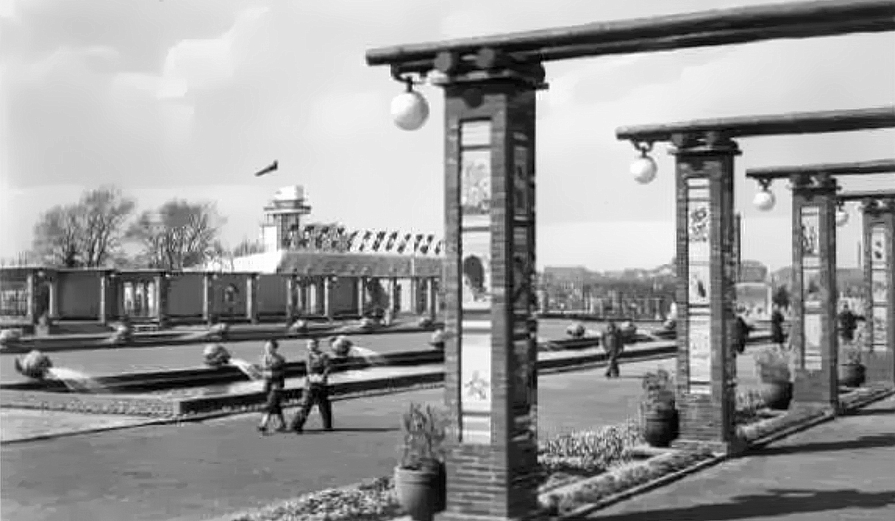
Grugapark, Reichsgartenschau 1938, Keramikhof

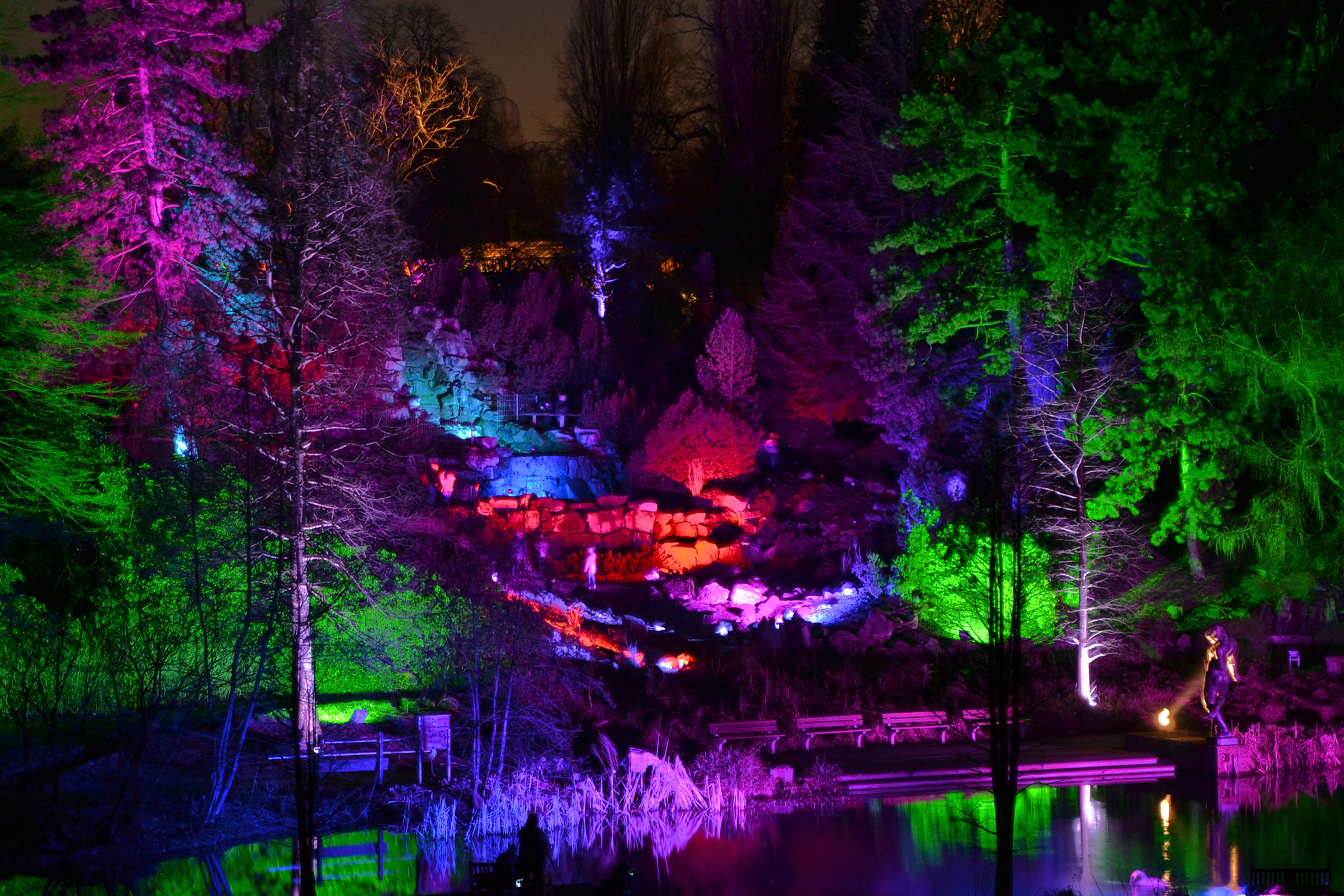
Grugapark illuminated, 2015

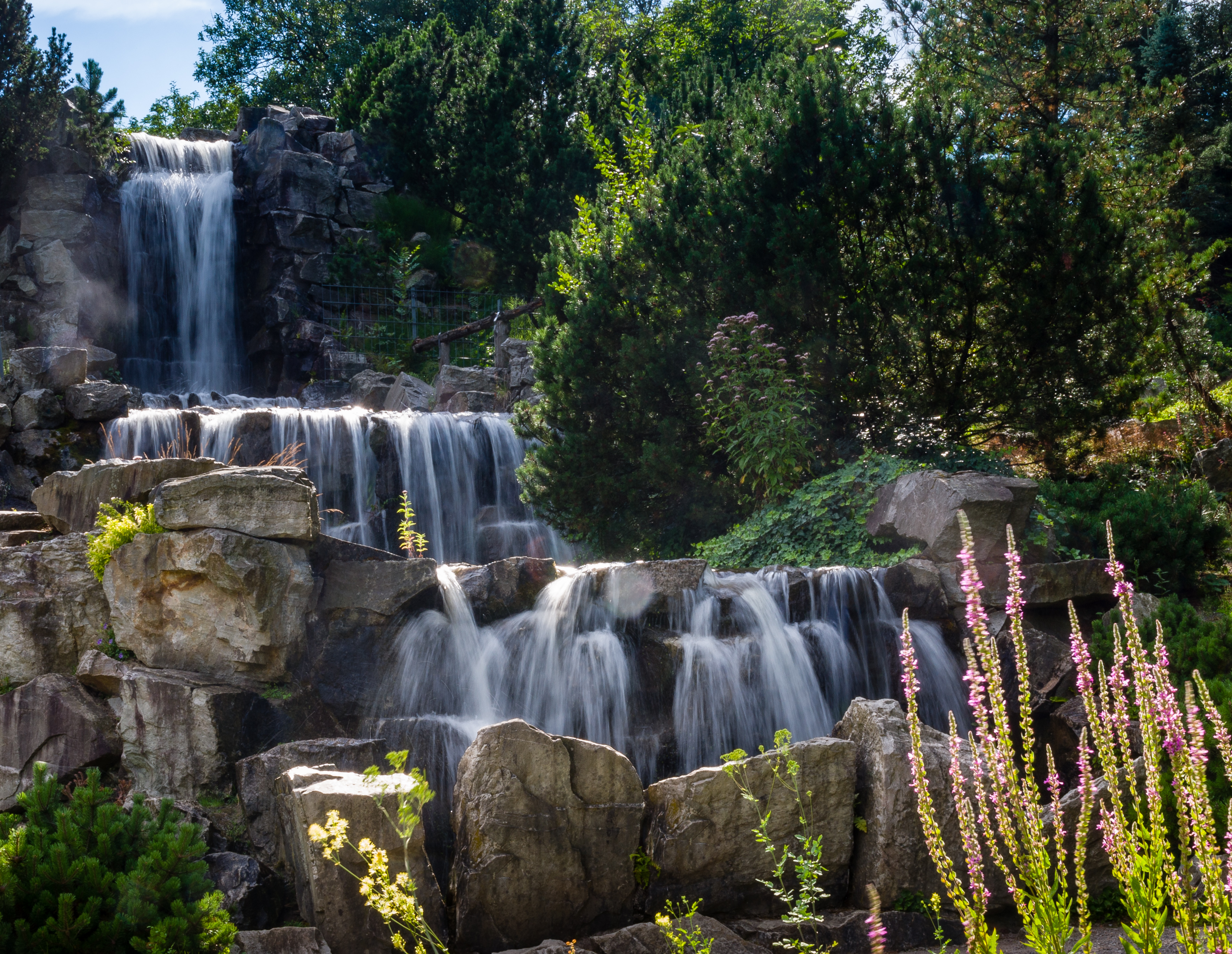
Grugapark, Waterfall

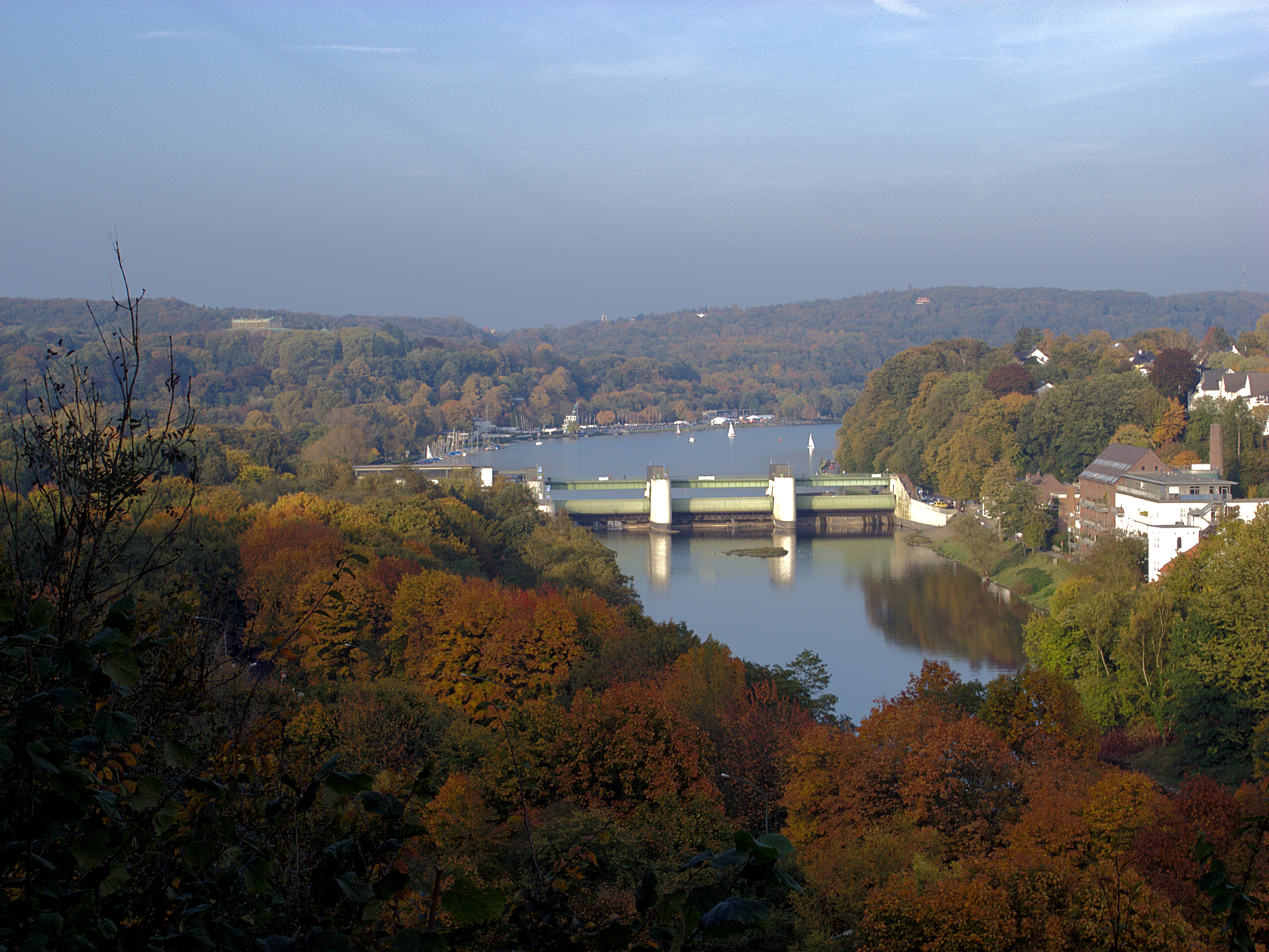
Baldeneysee

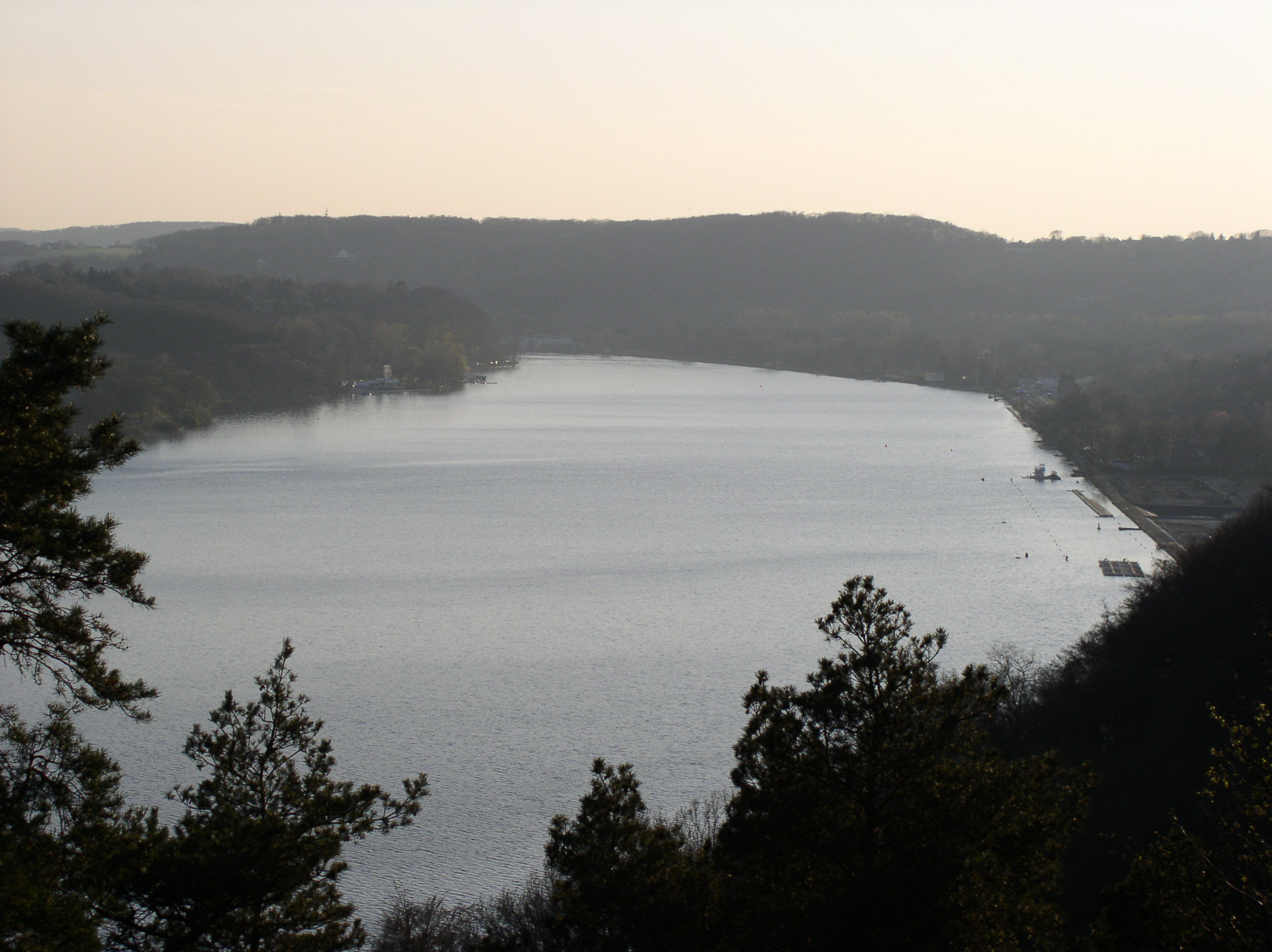
Baldeneysee

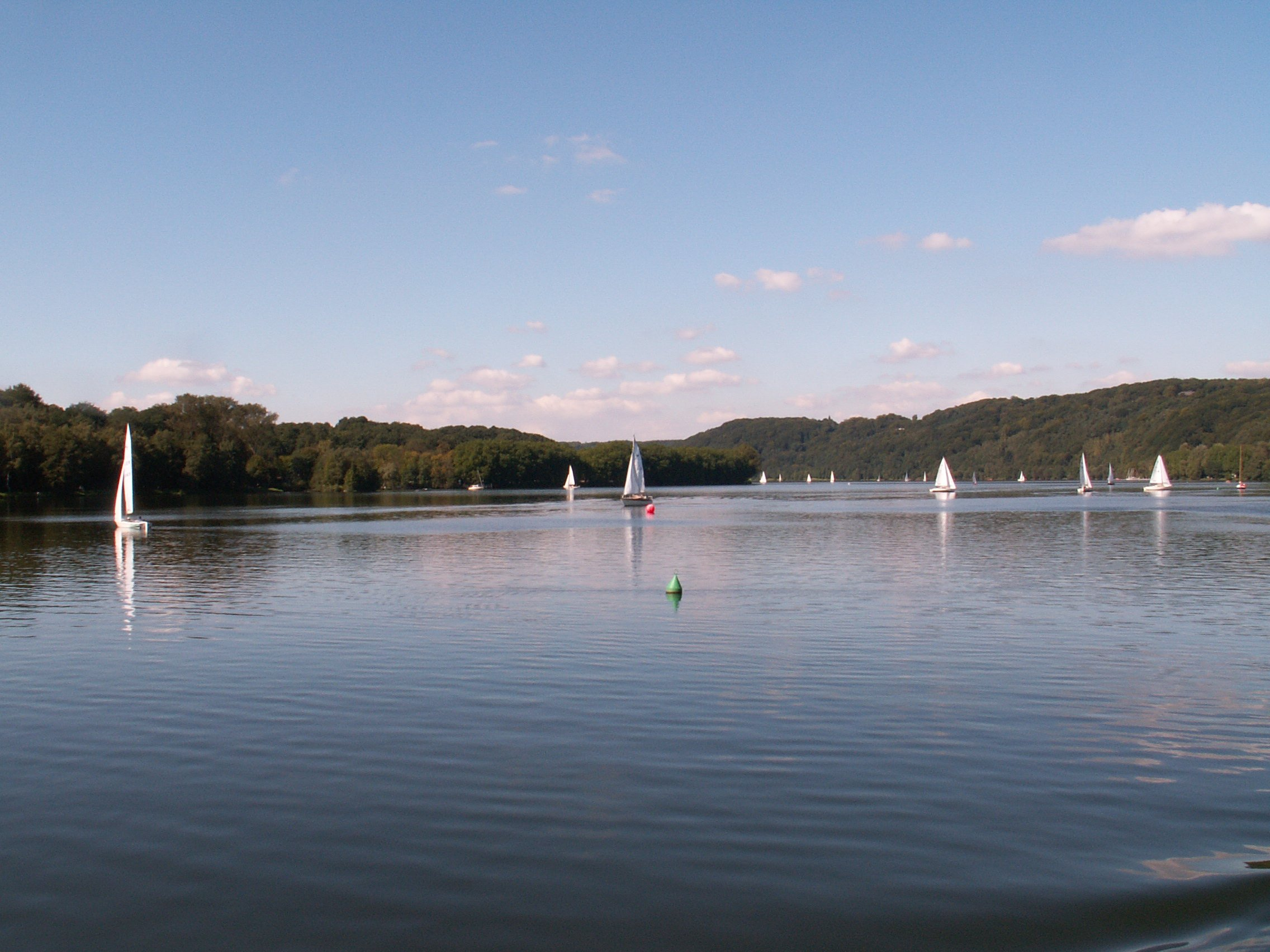
Baldeneysee

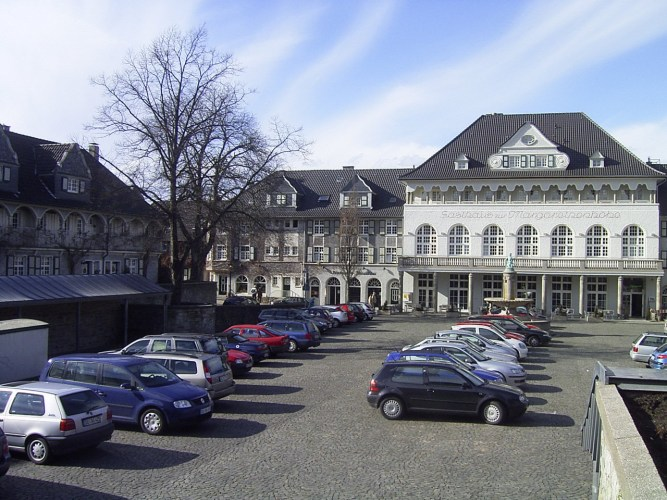
Marketplace of Margarethenhöhe I

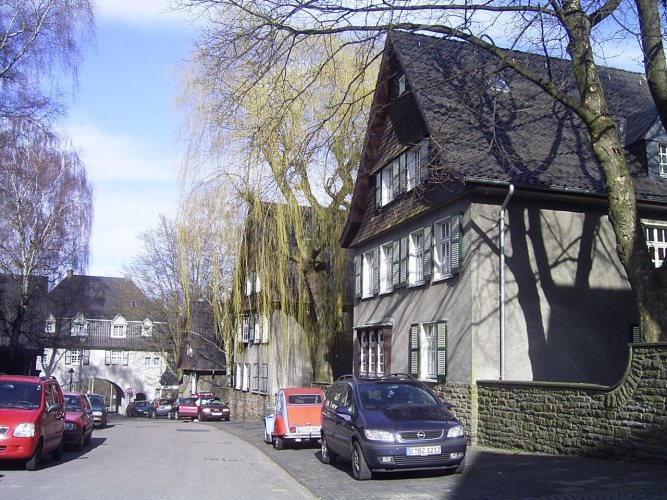
Margarethenhöhe houses

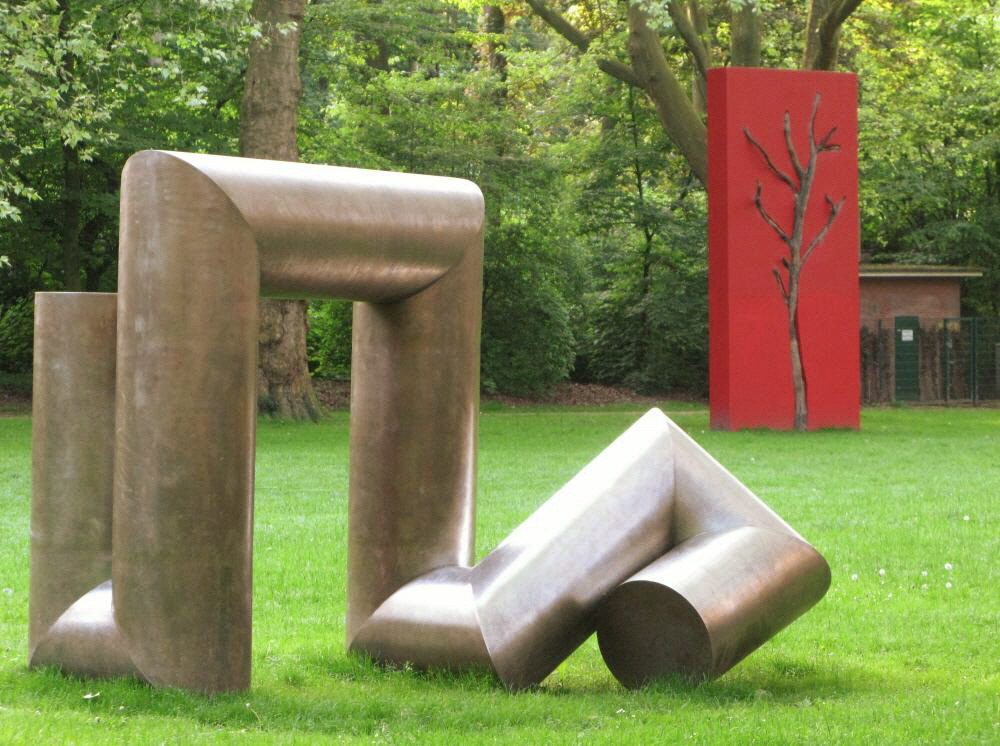
Sculptures by Friedrich Gräsel and Gloria Friedmann at the Moltkeplatz

== Notable people ==
=== Natives ===
People born in Essen:

- Gerd Albrecht (1935–2014), conductor
- Karl Albrecht (1920–2014), entrepreneur
- Theo Albrecht (1922–2010), entrepreneur; brother of Karl
- Peter Anders (1908–1954), operatic tenor
- Karl Baedeker (1801–1859), publisher
- Jürgen Bartsch (1946–1976), serial killer
- Ute Berg (born 1953), politician
- Naftali Bezem (1924–2018), artist
- Ali Bilgin (born 1981), footballer
- Franz Blücher (1896–1959), politician
- Hermann Blumenthal (1905–1942), sculptor
- Wilhelm Börger (1896–1962), Nazi politician
- Karl Brandt (1899–1975), agricultural economist
- Sabine Braun (born 1965), track athlete
- Dennis Brinkmann (born 1978), footballer
- Ernest B. H. Busch (1885–1945), Generalfeldmarschall
- Gunter d'Alquen (1910–1998), editor
- Marc Degens (born 1971), writer
- Ulrich Deppendorf (born 1950), journalist
- Marius Ebbers (born 1978), footballer
- Jutta Eckenbach (born 1952), politician
- Thomas Eller (born 1980), marathon runner)
- Rüdiger Fahlenbrach (born 1974), economist
- Malek Fakhro (born 1997), footballer
- Friedrich Karl Florian (1894–1975), Nazi Gauleiter
- James Ingo Freed (1930–2005), architect
- Bettina Franckenberg (1956-2018) artist
- Matt Frei (born 1963), journalist
- Herbert Girardet (publisher) (1910–1972), publisher
- Herbert Girardet (born 1943), environmental activist
- Harald Grohs (born 1944), race car driver
- Brigitte Hamann (1940–2016), author
- Hildegard Hamm-Brücher (1921–2016), politician
- Walter Heiman (1901–2007), centenarian and WW1 survivor
- Alfred Herrhausen (1930–1989), banker
- André Hoffmann (born 1993), footballer
- Axel Honneth (born 1949), philosopher
- Carl Humann (1839–1896), engineer
- Wilhelm Kalveram (1882–1951), university professor
- Christian Keller (born 1972), swimmer
- Fritz G. A. Kraemer (1908–2003), military educator
- Diether Krebs (1947–2000), actor
- Helene Kröller-Müller (1869–1939), art collector
- Alfred Krupp (1812–1887), inventor
- Alfried Krupp von Bohlen und Halbach (1907–1967), Nazi industrialist
- Bertha Krupp (1886–1957), daughter of Friedrich Alfred
- Friedrich Alfred Krupp (1854–1902), steel manufacturer
- Friedrich C. Krupp (1787–1826), founder of Krupp family business
- Heinz Kubsch (1930–1993), football goalkeeper
- Hubert Lampo (1920–2006), writer
- Johanna Langefeld (1900–1974), Nazi guard
- Arthur Laumann (1894–1970), flying ace
- Issachar Berend Lehmann (1661–1730), banker
- Jens Lehmann (born 1969), footballer
- Helga Niessen Masthoff (born 1941), tennis player
- Hartmut Vogtmann (born 1942), organic agriculturist
- Armin Meiwes (born 1961), convicted murderer known as the Cannibal of Rothenburg
- Frank Mill (born 1958), footballer
- Harry S. Morgan (1945–2011), pornographic film director
- Alfred Müller-Armack (1901–1978), politician
- Henry Osterman (1862-????), architect
- Friedrich Panse (1899–1973), psychiatrist
- Mille Petrozza (born 1967), guitarist
- Helmut Rahn (1929–2003), footballer
- Uta Ranke-Heinemann (1927–2021), theologian
- Otto Rehhagel (born 1938), footballer
- Uwe Reinders (born 1955), footballer
- Günther Rennert (1911–1978), opera director
- Heinz Rühmann (1902–1994), actor
- Leroy Sané (born 1996), footballer
- Klaus Scharioth (1946–2025), diplomat
- Magdalene Schauss-Flake (1921–2008), composer and organist
- Hilde Krahwinkel Sperling (1908–1981), tennis player
- John Steppling (1870–1932), actor
- David D. Stern (born 1956), artist
- Martin Stratmann (born 1954), electrochemist
- Marianne Strauss (1923–1996), Holocaust survivor
- Josef Terboven (1898–1945), Nazi Gauleiter
- Bernhard Termath (1928–2004), footballer
- Johan van Galen (1604–1653), commodore
- Kyriakos Velopoulos (born 1965), politician
- Albert Vögler (1877–1945), politician
- Elisabeth Volkmann (1936–2006), actress
- Pia Walkenhorst (born 1993), volleyball player
- Daniel Wende (born 1984), skater

=== Honorary citizens ===
The city of Essen has been awarding honorary citizenships since 1879 but has (coincidentally) discontinued this tradition after the foundation of the Federal Republic of Germany in 1949. A notable exception was made in 2007, when Berthold Beitz, the president of the Alfried Krupp von Bohlen und Halbach Foundation received honorary citizenship for his long lasting commitment to the city. The following list contains all honorary citizens of the city of Essen:

- 1879 Otto von Bismarck – Chancellor of Germany
- 1888 Friedrich Hammacher – politician, lawyer and economist
- 1895 Johann Heinrich Peter Beising – Roman catholic theologian
- 1896 Friedrich Alfred Krupp – industrialist (spouse of Margarethe Krupp, see below)
- 1901 Heinrich Carl Sölling – tradesman and benefactor
- 1906 Erich Zweigert – Lord Mayor (1886–1906)
- 1912 Margarethe Krupp – benefactress (spouse of Friedrich Alfred Krupp, see above)
- 1917 Paul von Hindenburg – Generalfeldmarschall and army leader, later President of Germany
- 1949 Viktor Niemeyer – councilman (posthumous recognition)
- 2007 Berthold Beitz – president of the Alfried Krupp von Bohlen und Halbach Foundation

Today, the highest award of the city is the Ring of Honour, which Berthold Beitz, for example, had already received in 1983. Other bearers of the Ring of Honour include Essen's former Lord Mayor and later President of Germany, Gustav Heinemann, as well as Franz Cardinal Hengsbach, the first Bishop of Essen. Berthold Beitz (1973) and his wife Else Beitz (2006) are recipients of the Righteous Among the Nations recognized by the Yad Vashem for having saved about 800 Jewish lives during World War II.

== Sport ==
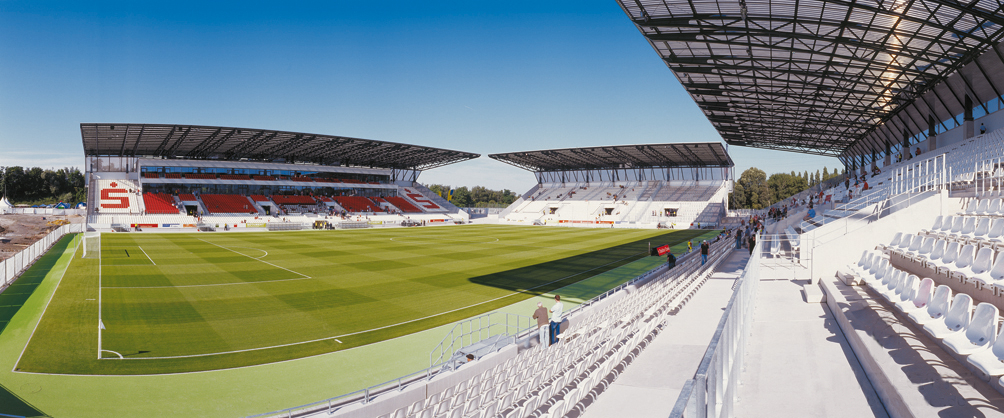
Stadion Essen

The biggest association football clubs in Essen are Rot-Weiss Essen (Red-White Essen) and Schwarz-Weiß Essen (Black-White Essen). Stadion Essen, is the home stadium for Rot-Weiß, is located in the north of Essen. Rot-Weiss Essen is playing in the third tier of the German football league system, 3. Liga, and Schwarz-Weiß Essen in the fifth tier, Oberliga Nordrhein-Westfalen. Schwarz-Weiß Essens home stadium is Uhlenkrugstadion, located in the southern part of the city. Other football clubs are BV Altenessen and TuS Helene Altenessen. In women's football, SGS Essen are members of top division Frauen-Bundesliga.

Another important and famous sports club is TUSEM Essen, with a handball team that have won several national and international titles.

The city's main basketball team is ETB Essen, currently called the ETB Wohnbau Baskets for sponsorship reasons. The team is one of the main teams in Germany's second division ProA and has attempted to move up to Germany's elite league Basketball Bundesliga. The Baskets play their home games at the Sportpark am Hallo.

Essen hosted the 1955 nine-pin bowling World Championships and the final round of the FIBA EuroBasket 1971. The city is also home to the VV Humann Essen volleyball team.
