= 2017 in art =

The year 2017 in art involved various significant events.

== Events ==
- January 29 – After extensive restoration the Lehighton a mural by Franz Kline is unveiled to the public at its new home at the Allentown Art Museum in Allentown, Pennsylvania.
- May 18 – Sotheby's auctions Jean-Michel Basquiat's 1982 painting Untitled created with oil stick and spray paint and depicting a skull, and in doing so the work sets a new record high for any U.S. artist at auction, selling for $110,500,000.
- June 14 – Gambian-British tintype photographer Khadija Saye and her mother are among the victims of the Grenfell Tower fire in London.
- August – Woman-Ochre (oil on canvas, 1954–55) by Willem de Kooning, stolen from the University of Arizona Museum of Art in 1985, is returned to the institution it was taken from after 31 years.
- September 22 – The Zeitz Museum of Contemporary Art Africa in Cape Town, converted from a grain silo by Thomas Heatherwick, opens.
- October - A section of marble mosaic flooring from one of the Roman Emperor Caligula's pleasure ships from Lake Nemi in Lazio is repatriated to Italy after having been rediscovered by happenstance by the author and antiquity restorer Dario del Bufalo to have been serving as a coffee table in the apartment of New York City and husband and wife antique dealers Helen and Nereo Fioratti.
- October 7 - The President of the Louvre in Paris, Jean-Luc Martinez objects to the work "Domestikator" (2015) by Atelier Van Lieshout an architectural sculpture in which two interlocking buildings appear to be engaged in a sexual act and pulls it from the exhibition Hors Les Murs, (Foire Internationale d'Art Contemperain’s outdoor program of architectural projects, sculptures, performances, and sound pieces that runs concurrently to the fair) held in the Tuileries Garden where it would have been displayed nearby a playground and instead the work is displayed by the Centre Georges Pompidou in the front square outside of that art institution for a simultaneous run.
- November 11 – Louvre Abu Dhabi, an art museum in Abu Dhabi (United Arab Emirates) designed by Jean Nouvel, opens.
- November 15 – The painting Salvator Mundi,
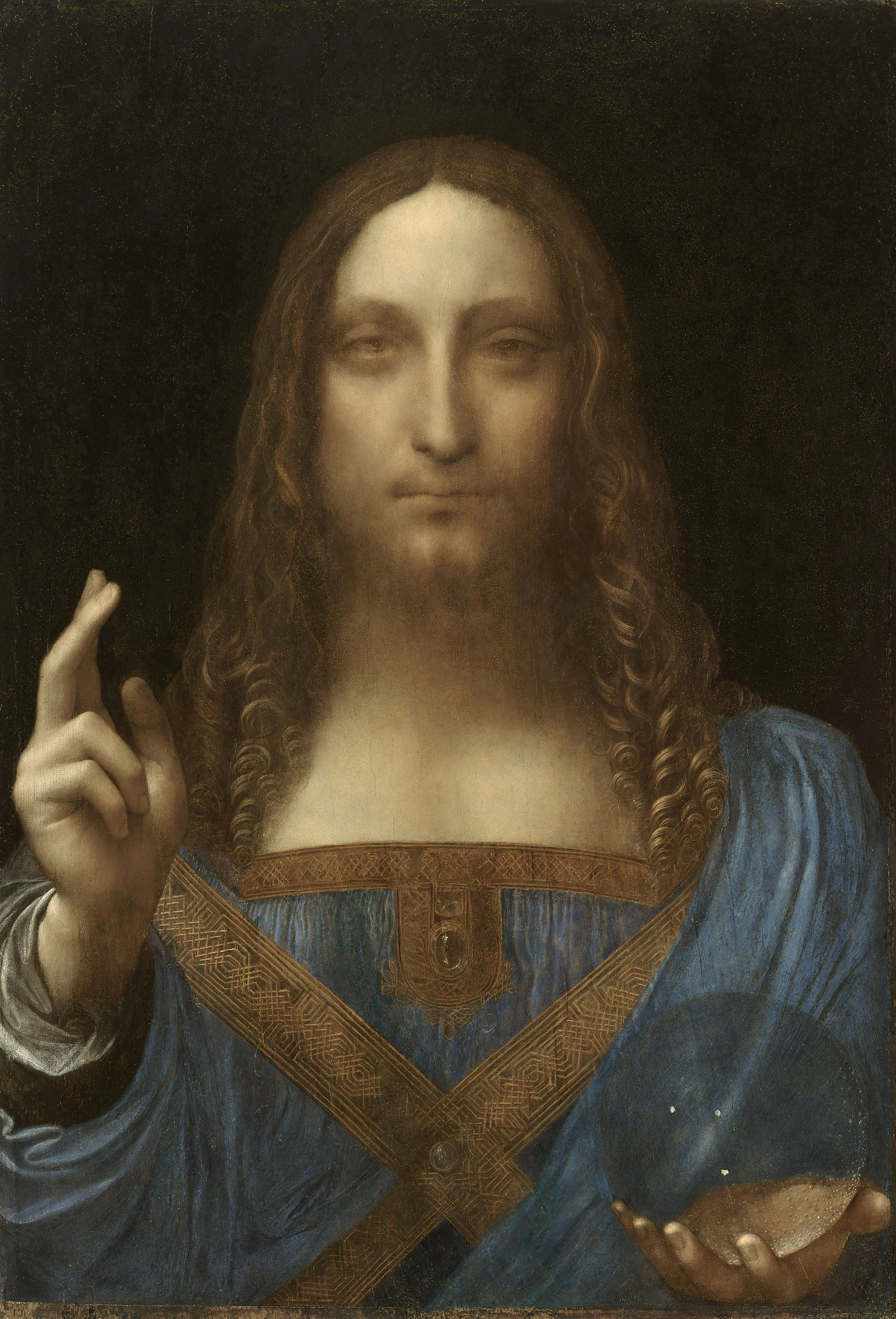
  Salvator Mundi by Leonardo da Vinci
  attributed to Leonardo da Vinci, is auctioned at Christie's in New York City for $US400 million ($450M with fees), making it the most expensive work of art ever sold. On December 8, it is announced that has been acquired for the Louvre Abu Dhabi's permanent collection.
- December 2 – Sea World Culture and Arts Center, Shekou, China (in a joint venture with the Victoria and Albert Museum), designed by Fumihiko Maki, is opened.
- Undated – When the White House requests the loan of a Vincent van Gogh painting from the Solomon R. Guggenheim Museum collection, Landscape With Snow, chief Guggenheim curator, Nancy Spector instead suggests America, a sculpture of a gold toilet by Maurizio Cattelan.

== Exhibitions ==
- January 14 until April 9 - Two Centuries of American Still-Life Painting: The Frank and Michelle Hevrdejs Collection at the Museum of Fine Arts, Houston.
- February 9 until May 29 - "David Hockney" at the Tate Britain in London and then November 27 until February 25, 2018 at the Metropolitan Museum of Art in New York City.
- February 10 until September 6 - "Visionaries: Creating a Modern Guggenheim" at the Solomon R. Guggenheim Museum in New York City.
- March 3 until July 23 – "Georgia O'Keeffe: Living Modern" at the Brooklyn Museum in Brooklyn, New York.
- March 5 until September 4 - "Suzanne McClelland: Just Left Feel Right" at the Aldrich Contemporary Art Museum in Ridgefield, Connecticut.
- March 17 until June 11 – The "Whitney Biennial" (curated by Christopher Y. Lew and Mia Locks) at the Whitney Museum of American Art in New York City.
- April 3 until June 9 - "Hubert Davis: Scenes of Pennsylvania" at the Ron K. DeLong Gallery at Penn State Lehigh Valley in Central Valley (catalogue essay by Vincent DiCicco), Pennsylvania in concert with "Hubert Davis: Foreign Lands" (May 16 - June 26) curated by Deborah Rabinsky at the Bradbury-Sullivan LGBT Community Center in Allentown, Pennsylvania, and “Hubert Davis: Costume Design” (May 22 to July 21) at the 514 Gallery in Allentown, Pennsylvania.
- April 6 until July 15 - "Unerased Journeys: A Survey of Works by Darryl Pottorf' at the Museum of Outdoor Arts in Englewood, Colorado.
- April 9 until January 3, 2017 - Damien Hirst "Treasures From The Wreck Of The Unbelievable" at the Palazzo Grassi and the Punta della Dogana in Venice.
- April 15 until October 29 - "Adrián Villar Rojas: The Theater of Disappearance" at the Metropolitan Museum of Art in New York City.
- April 21 until September 17 - "We Wanted a Revolution: Black Radical Women, 1965–85" at the Brooklyn Museum in Brooklyn, New York.
- April 24 until July 30 - "Irving Penn: Centennial" at the Metropolitan Museum of Art in New York City.
- June 21 until October 8 - Sargent: The Watercolours at the Dulwich Picture Gallery in Dulwich, London.
- June 24 until August 26 - "Very Appropriate at the Robert Brrman gallery in Santa Monica, California.
- July 11 until November 5 - "New York, New York" at the Nassau County Museum of Art in Roslyn Harbor, New York.
- July 12 until October 22 - "Soul of a Nation: Art in the Age of Black Power" at the Tate Modern in London.
- July 29 until October 22 – "Archibald Prize, Wynne Prize, Sir John Sulman Prize" at the Art Gallery of New South Wales in Sydney.
- October 8 until August 28, 2017 - "Liz Glynn: The Archaeology of Another Possible Future" at Mass MoCA in North Adams, Massachusetts.
- October 31 - April 1, 2018 - "Club 57: Film, Performance, and Art in the East Village, 1978-1983" at MoMA in New York City.
- November 2 until February 4, 2018 - "Gurlitt: Status Report “Degenerate Art” Confiscated and Sold" simultaneously at the Kunstmuseum Bern in Bern, Switzerland and the Bundeskunsthalle in Bonn, Germany.
- November 3 - April 4, 2018 - "Josef Albers in Mexico" at the Solomon R. Guggenheim Museum I. New York City.
- November 13 until February 12, 2018 - "Michelangelo: Divine Draftsman and Designer" at the Metropolitan Museum of Art in New York City.
- November 17 until February 2. 2018 - "Bad Land: Alex Da Corte" at the Josh Lilley gallery in London.

== Works ==
- Banksy
  - Mediterranean Sea View 2017 (triptych).
  - The Walled Off Hotel.
- Jonas Burgert – Zeitlaich
- Maurizio Cattelan – America
- Martin Dawe – Statue of Martin Luther King Jr.
- Jeremy Deller – "What Is The City But The People?", opening the Manchester International Festival in England.
- Suzy Kellems Dominik – "I Can Feel" at the Nautilus South Beach during Art Basel Miami Beach.
- GCC (art collective) (Nanu Al-Hamad, Abdullah Al-Mutairi, Aziz Alqatami, Barrak Alzaid, Khalid al Gharaballi, Amal Khalaf, Fatima Al Qadiri, and Monira Al Qadiri) – "Local Police Find Fruit with Spells".
- Lara Favaretto – "Thinking Head", cloud of water vapor suspended over Nottingham Contemporary gallery in England.
- Liz Glynn – "Open House" East 60th Street at Grand Army Plaza on the perimeter of Central Park in New York City.
- Urs Fischer – "Things".
- Ralph Heimans – Portrait of Prince Philip.
- David Hockney – In the Studio, December 2017.
- Martin Jennings – Bronze of George Orwell, outside Broadcasting House, London.
- Tony Matelli – "Hera" at the Aldrich Museum of Contemporary Art in Ridgefield, Connecticut.
- Benjamin Nordsmark - NYC Subway Urinal.
- Lorenzo Quinn - Support (sculpture) in Venice, Italy.
- Erwin Redl – "Whiteout" at Madison Square Park in New York City.
- Yinka Shonibare – "Wind Sculpture" conceived and designed in 2017 installed by the Public Art Fund on the outside perimeter of Central Park at Grand Army Plaza at East 60th in New York City from March 7, 2018 until October 14, 2018.
- Kristen Visbal – Fearless Girl, on the Bowling Green in Manhattan. New York City.
- Jordan Wolfson – "Real Violence".
- Héctor Zamora – Memorándum at Museo Universitario del Chopo in Mexico City.
- Statue of Peyton Manning, Indianapolis

== Awards ==
- Archibald Prize - Mitch Cairns for "Agatha Gothe-Snape"
- Artes Mundi Prize - John Akomfrah
- Turner Prize: Lubaina Himid
- Venice Biennale (May 5–November 26)
  - Leone d'Oro for Lifetime Achievement: Carolee Schneemann (United States)
  - Leone d'Oro for Best National Participation: Anne Imhof (Germany)
  - Leone d'Oro for Best artist in the Main Curated Show: Franz Erhard Walther (Germany)
  - Silver Lion for the Promising artist: Hassan Khan (Egypt)

== Films ==
- Final Portrait
- Loving Vincent (first fully painted animated film)
- Shadowman
- The Square
- The Thief Collector

== Deaths ==
- January 2 – John Berger, 90, English art critic (Ways of Seeing), novelist (G. winner of the 1972 Booker Prize), painter and poet
- January 10
  - Leonard French, 88, Australian painter and stained glass window designer
  - Daan van Golden, 80, Dutch artist
- January 13 – Antony Armstrong-Jones, 1st Earl of Snowdon, 86, English photographer and filmmaker
- January 15 – Ciel Bergman, 78, American painter
- January 18 – Yosl Bergner, 96, Austrian born Israeli painter
- January 21 – Biruta Baumane, 94, Latvian artist
- January 22 – Moshe Gershuni, 80, Israeli painter and sculptor
- January 23 – J. S. G. Boggs, 62, American artist
- January 26 – Charles Recher, 66, American artist
- January 27 – Saloua Raouda Choucair, 100, Lebanese painter and sculptor
- January 30 – Dore Ashton, 88, American art historian
- February 11 – Harvey Lichtenstein, 87, American arts administrator (Brooklyn Academy of Music) and founder of the Next Wave Festival
- February 13 – Giorgos Ioannou, 90, Greek artist
- February 14 – Odd Tandberg, 92, Norwegian painter
- February 16
  - Jannis Kounellis, 80, Greek Italian artist connected to Arte Povera
  - Dimitris Mytaras, 83, Greek painter
- February 20 – Sofía Ímber, 92, Romanian born Venezuelan journalist and founder of the Contemporary Art Museum of Caracas
- February 22 – Fritz Koenig, 92, German sculptor (The Sphere)
- February 23 – Ren Hang, 29, Chinese photographer
- March 1 – Gustav Metzger, 90, German-born British artist and political activist
- March 2 – Spencer Hays, 80, American art collector
- March 6 – Sydney Ball, 83, Australian painter (death announced on this date)
- March 9 – Sir Howard Hodgkin, 84, English painter
- March 13 – Henri Cueco, 88, French painter and author (Conversations with My Gardener)
- March 18 – Trisha Brown, 80, Postmodernist American choreographer and dancer
- March 20 – David Rockefeller, 101, American art collector and patron, Chairman of the Board of MoMA
- March 23 – Mirella Bentivoglio, 88, Italian artist
- March 23 – George Woodman, 85, American artist
- March 25 – Julian Stanczak, 88, Polish born American Op Art painter
- March 26 – Mai Dantsig, 86, Belarusian artist
- March 31
  - Gilbert Baker, 65, American artist (creator of the Rainbow Flag)
  - James Rosenquist, 83, American painter
- April 7
  - Arturo García Bustos, 90, Mexican painter
  - Glenn O'Brien, 70, American writer
- April 18 - Barkley L. Hendricks, 72, American painter
- April 21 - Magdalena Abakanowicz, 86, Polish sculptor and fiber artist
- April 28 - Vito Acconci, 77, American artist and architectural designer
- May 2 - A. R. Penck, 77, German painter
- May 5 - Michael Zwack, 67, American painter and sculptor
- May 6 - Jack Tilton, 66, American art dealer, gallerist
- May 15 - Felipe Ehrenberg, 73, Mexican artist
- May 25 - Marie Cosindas, 93, American photographer
- June 7 - Trento Longaretti, 100, Italian painter
- June 9 - Edit DeAk, 68, Hungarian born American art critic and writer
- June 14 - Khadija Saye, c. 25, British photographer
- June 15 - Olbram Zoubek, 91, Czech sculptor
- June 18 - Hans Breder - 81, German-born American artist
- July 3 - José Luis Cuevas, 83, Mexican artist
- July 7 - Lala Rukh, Pakistani artist and women's rights activist, 69
- July 9 - Ilya Glazunov, 87, Russian painter
- July 20 - Kenneth Jay Lane, 85, American costume jewelry designer and art collector
- July 25 - Marian Konieczny, 87, Polish sculptor (Monument to the Heroes of Warsaw)
- July 29 - Olivier Strebelle, 90, Belgian sculptor
- August 3 - Alan Peckolick - 76, American graphic designer (Revlon), painter, and photographer
- August 8 - Arlene Gottfried, 66, American photographer
- September 3 - John Ashbery, 90, American poet and art critic
- September 5 - Arno Rink, 76. German painter
- September 8 - Pierre Bergé, 86, French businessman and art collector
- September 18 - Pete Turner, 83, American photographer
- September 19 - David Shepherd, 86, British painter and conservationist
- September 26 - Robert Delpire, 91, French photographer, publisher and filmmaker
- October 6 - Holly Block, 58, American museum director (The Bronx Museum of Art)
- October 10 - Fernando de Szyszlo, 92, Peruvian painter, sculptor and printmaker
- October 18 - Unity Spencer, 87, English artist
- October 29
  - Richard Hambleton, 65, Canadian artist
  - Linda Nochlin, 86, American art historian
- November 8 - Trevor Bell, 87, British artist (death announced on this date)
- November 15 - Frans Krajcberg, 96, Polish-born Brazilian painter
- December 1 - Enrico Castellani, 87 Italian painter
- December 3 - Ivan Chermayeff, 85, American graphic designer ("The Red Nine" in front of 9 West 57th Street)
- December 12 - Lewis Manilow, 90, American arts patron (Museum of Contemporary Art Chicago)
- December 26 - Tim Rollins, 62, American artist
