= Mara Kölmel =

German art historian and museum director (born 1989)

Mara-Johanna Kölmel (she/her)
- Born: 1989 (age 36–37); Karlsruhe, Germany
- Occupations: Curator, Art Historian
- Employer: Zeppelin Museum Friedrichshafen

Mara-Johanna Kölmel (born 1989) is a German curator and art historian.

Kölmel has worked internationally in various curatorial positions, including for the Biennale of Sydney, the Arko Art Centre Seoul, the Kunsthalle Hamburg and the Akademie Schloss Solitude in Stuttgart. She has been the head of the Art Department at the Zeppelin Museum Friedrichshafen, since January 2024.

Her curatorial practice focuses on the intersections of art, technology, and society, addressing pressing contemporary issues through a plurality of perspectives. Demonstrated by the 2025 exhibition "Choose your Player. Gaming from Dice to Pixel" as reviewed by ARD Tagesschau and SWR Fernsehen.

== Early life and education ==
Kölmel completed her master's degree in art history at the Courtauld Institute of Art and earned her PhD from Leuphana University of Lüneburg with the dissertation Sculpture in the Augmented Sphere.

This research, supported by the German Academic Scholarship Foundation known also as the Studienstiftung has led to a book backed by the Henry Moore Foundation and the Geschwister Boehringer Ingelheim Foundation for the Humanities. It explores the transformation of sculpture through digital technologies by investigating how speculative, feminist and decolonial sculptural concepts acquire new meaning in the digital realm, with a book on the topic to be published by DeGruyter in 2025.

== Career (selected) ==
- Head of Art Department, at Zeppelin Museum Friedrichshafen
- Head Curator, at V.O Curations, London
- Co-Founder, at SALOON.London, Women In Arts Network, London & Board Member, at SALOON International
- Curator, at Approved(by)Pablo, London
- Curator, at peer-to-space, Berlin
- Guest-curator, at ARKO Art Center, Seoul
- Curator-in-Residence, Digital Solitude at Akademie Schloss Solitude, Stuttgart
- Curatorial Assistant, at Biennale of Sydney
- Program Curator, at Young Patrons Hamburger Kunsthalle, Hamburg

== Publications (selected) ==
- (Post)Digitalität in den Künsten (2024) – co-authored with Denise Helene Sumi, explores the impact of post-digital transformation on the arts, highlighting cultural policy frameworks and offering a glimpse into future action areas.
- The Sculptural in the (Post-)Digital Age (2023) – co-edited with Prof. Dr. Ursula Ströbele, this anthology from DeGruyter explores new meanings of sculpture within digital and post-digital contexts.
- Dada Data: Contemporary Art and Post-Truth Politics (2023) – co-edited with Dr. Sarah Hegenbart, this anthology published by Bloomsbury examines the relationship between contemporary art and post-truth politics.
- All Too Human in a Posthuman Age? On Cyborgs, Avatars and Empty Shells (2022) - in Mirror Mirror, Fashion and the Psyche, ed. MoMu Antwerp, exhibition catalogue.
- Digital Plasticity: From an Art Historical Phenomenon to Contemporary Architectures of Power (2022) - in Die Vibration der Dinge, ed. Elke aus dem Moore, Fellbach: Triennale der Kleinplastik, exhibition catalogue.
- Pattern Recognition: From Tracing Figures in Sand to Devising Other Futures (2021) - a conversation with Shirin Fahimi
- Borne of the Flowing Water (2021) - a conversation with Marie-Eve Levasseur
- Contagious Codes and Plastic Visions (2018) - in Michael Rees Pneumatopia, Nerman Museum of Contemporary Art, Kansas.
- Parallelworlds. On Joseph Beuys and Alice Channer (2016) – ed. Museum Kurhaus Kleve, exhibition catalogue.
- Alisa Baremboym between the Corporeal and the Digital (2015) – MA Thesis published in DIENADEL–Magazine for Cultural Studies and Visual Arts, Nr. 3, July 2015, ISSN 2195-9943, Lüneburg (in German).
- Texte zur Kunst (2014) – review of Ryan Trecartin at KW Institute for Contemporary Art, Berlin
