= Vogelheimer Klinge =

280,000 year old flint tool

The Vogelheimer Klinge (German: Vogelheim Blade) is an approximately 280,000 year old flint tool, discovered in 1926 during the construction of the Rhine-Herne Canal in Vogelheim, north of the city of Essen. In older publications it is also known as the Klingenschaber von Vogelheim. It was long considered to be the oldest accurately dated artifact in North Rhine-Westphalia, and can be found in the Ruhr Museum.
