= HG Merz =

German architect and museum designer

Hans Günter Merz, better known as HG Merz (born 1947 in Tailfingen) is a German architect and museum designer. He is the founder and director of hg merz architekten museumsgestalter, an architecture office that specializes in museum and exhibition design and in refurbishing listed buildings. The office has branches in Stuttgart and Berlin.

From 1993 to 2007, HG Merz was professor for exhibition design at the department of Visual Communication at the University of Applied Sciences in Pforzheim. From 2008 until 2014, he was professor for experimental design at the department of Architecture at Technische Universität Darmstadt. In 2014, he was awarded an honorary doctorate from TU Darmstadt.

HG Merz was president of the University Council of Bauhaus University Weimar from 2013 to 2017.

In May 2018, Merz was elected new member in the section architecture of Academy of Arts, Berlin. Since May 2024, he is director of the architecture section of the Academy of Arts.

== Awards (selection) ==
- 2003 German Architecture Award
- 2006 Critics Choice Award Germany
- 2011 German Design Award, Silver
- 2011 red dot communication design award
- 2012 Mies van der Rohe Prize, Nomination
- 2013 Focus Open Gold
- 2013 red dot communication design award

== Projects (selection) ==
- Zeppelin Museum Friedrichshafen (1993–1996)
- Alte Nationalgalerie Berlin (1993–2001)
- Concentration Camp Sachsenhausen Memorial (1998–2005)
- Mercedes-Benz Museum Stuttgart (1999–2006)
- European School of Management and Technology, transformation of the former State Council of East Germany, Berlin (2003–2006)
- Bundeswehr Military History Museum Dresden (2003–2010)
- Rebuilding and refurbishment of Berlin State Library (2000– ca. 2015)
- Porsche Museum Stuttgart (2005–2008)
- Conversion of a former Stasi prison into Berlin-Hohenschönhausen Memorial, Berlin (2008–2012)
- Extension and general refurbishment of Berlin State Opera (2009–2015)
- new permanent exhibition at Ruhr Museum at UNESCO World Heritage Site Zeche Zollverein, Essen (2005–2010)
- Tirol Panorama Innsbruck (2007–2011)
- Kunstkammer of Museum of Art History Vienna (2010–2013)
- Richard-Wagner-Museum, Bayreuth (2011–2015)
- Maison des Fondateurs Audemars Piguet, together with Bjarke Ingels Group (2014- )
- Rilke and Russia, traveling exhibition for German Literature Archive, 2016–2018
