= Migrantas =

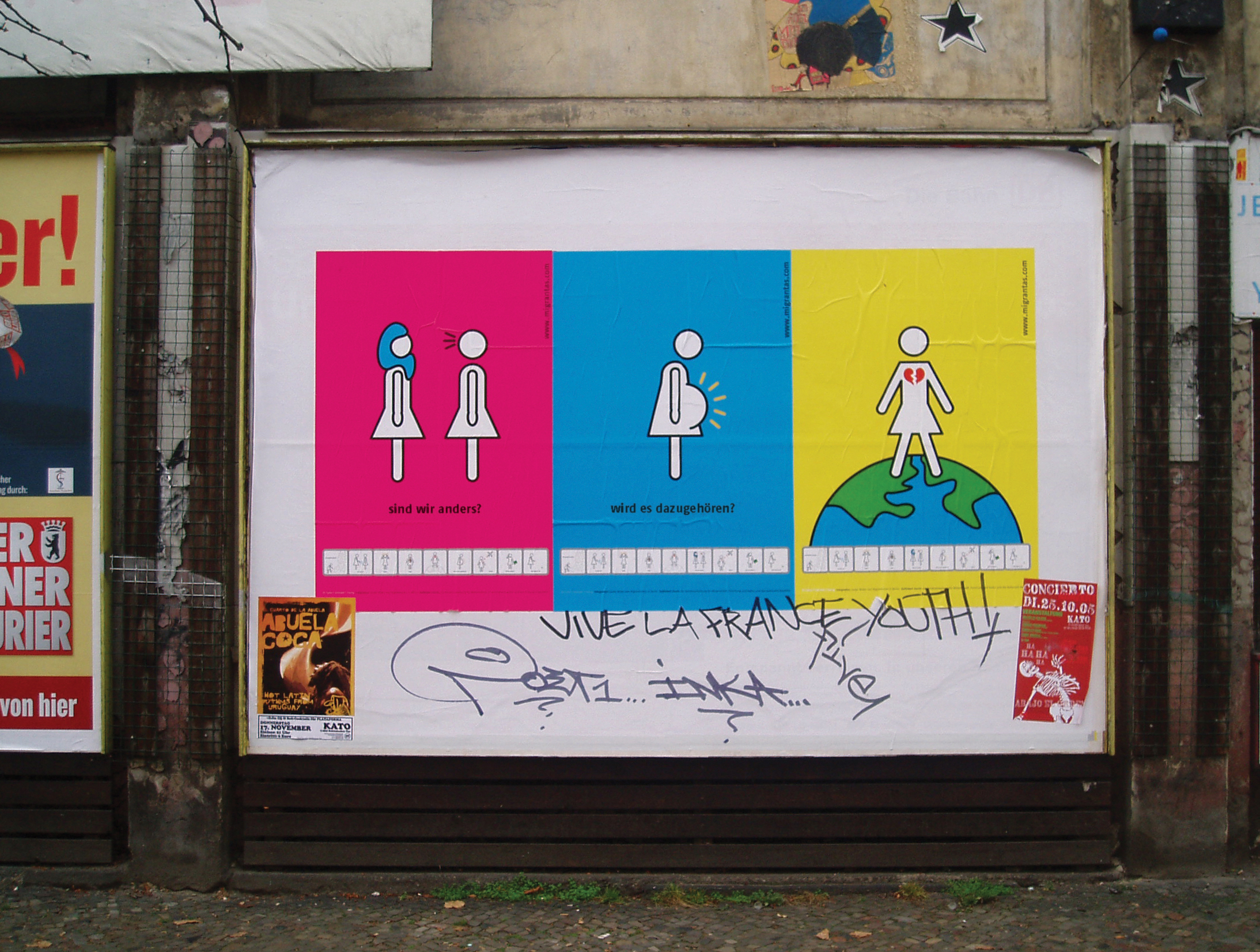
Posters on display in Berlin-Neukoeln as part of an urban action

Migrantas are an artist collective based in Berlin, Germany that formed in 2004. The collective focuses on themes such as migration, identity and intercultural communication and designs pictograms together with migrants which are then placed in public spaces in order to give voice to migrants living in Germany.

The collective is made up of migrants and is organised non-hierarchically. Since 2004, the project has been organising exhibitions in various European cities. In 2011, the collective was awarded the German award for integration and tolerance by the German chancellor, Angela Merkel on behalf of the Initiative Hauptstadt Berlin.

Migrantas views pictograms as universally understandable images and a global language. Pictograms designed by Migrantas are similar to those found all over in the world in public spaces where they are normally used in place of written language in advertising and street signs. The difference between Migrantas' pictograms is that they are used to highlight the individual, cultural, socio-economic and political aspects of migration.

The pictograms are developed during workshops together with migrant groups and associations. The idea is then to make visible the feelings and everyday experiences of migrants, which migrantas argue otherwise receive very little publicity. The collective mostly works with women and encourages workshop participants to express their everyday experiences, feelings and views of life as a migrant living in a foreign culture. The sketches produced in these workshops are then developed into pictograms by the collective members themselves.

Finally, the pictograms are placed in public spaces during 'urban actions' which until now have included using posters, billboards, and advertising on public transport. At the same time, migrantas also organises exhibitions of its work and the sketches produced during its workshops. Migrantas argues that this gives the migrants themselves the opportunity to receive public recognition for their own work. At the same time, this provides individuals who have very little access to the media the opportunity to publicise their own experiences of migration and immigration.

== Projects and exhibitions ==
- 2004 Proyecto Ausländer, Berlin, Germany and Buenos Aires.
- 2005 Integration Lauter Bilder von Migrantinnen, Berlin.
- 2006 Interkulturelle Werkstatt, Berlin.
- 2006 Bilder bewegen, Berlin.
- 2007 Bundesmigrantinnen, Hamburg.
- 2008 Bundesmigrantinnen, Cologne.
- 2009 Hessisches Landesmuseum Darmstadt.
- 2010 Sevilla Plural, Bild der Migration im öffentlichen Raum, Spain.
- 2010 Zeppelin Museum Friedrichshafen.
- 2011 Europa-Kind + Europa-Schule - Bilder der Vielfalt, Berlin.

== Projects migrantas have been involved in ==
- Seyla Benhabib, Judith Resnik (eds.): Migrations and Mobilities: Citizenship, Borders, and Gender. NY Press, ISBN 0-8147-7600-0 (Front over)
- Dirk Lange, Ayça Polat (Eds.): Migration und Alltag. Unsere Wirklichkeit ist anders. Wochenschau-Verlag, Schwalbach/Ts. 2010, ISBN 978-3-89974-659-4 (Front cover and illustrations)
- Susanne Stemmler: Multikultur 2.0; Willkommen im Einwanderungsland Deutschland. Wallstein Verlag, ISBN 978-3-8353-0840-4 (Front cover)

== Literature ==
- Julius Wiedemann (Ed.) Brand Identity Now! Winning brands from around the world. Taschen Verlag, 2009, ISBN 978-3-8365-1584-9, pp. 138–145. (online)
