= Mosman High School =

Coordinates: 33.830°S 151.243°E

- Mosman, New South Wales; Australia

Information
- Type: Public, secondary, co-educational, day school
- Motto: Only Effort Earns Success.
- Established: January 1961
- Principal: Susan Wyatt
- Enrolment: 1,029 (7–12)
- Campus: 769 Military Road
- Colours: Dark green and white
- Website: MHS website

Mosman High School, (abbreviation MHS) is a school located in Mosman, a suburb of Sydney, Australia, on Military Road. It is a co-educational high school operated by the New South Wales Department of Education with students from years 7 to 12. The school was established in 1961 and is one of the few state schools in NSW that has no school uniform.

== History ==
Established in January 1961, the campus site of Mosman High was originally the site of Mosman Public School, with the first building constructed in 1883. In February 1921, Mosman Public School was upgraded to the status of an Intermediate High School. In August 1961, the Department of Education announced that the Mosman Home Science School and the Boys' Intermediate High School were to be amalgamated to form the co-educational Mosman High School. The first Principal was Harold James Hamnett, who served until 1964 when he was appointed Principal of Crows Nest Boys High School. From 1961 the site was shared between the schools until 1968 when Mosman Public School moved to a new site bordered by Belmont Road, Myahgah Street and Gouldsbury Street.

In the mid-1980s, there was speculation that the Department of Education and Minister for Education, Rodney Cavalier, were looking at closing Mosman High, along with the nearby Cremorne Girls High School, which was denied by Cavalier, who however said that the Lower North Shore of Sydney had "one high school too many". In July 1985, Cavalier announced that Cremorne Girls would be closed by mid-1987, with the remaining students transferred to Mosman High or Willoughby Girls High School.

In the 1980s, in order to distinguish themselves from nearby private schools (Mosman being one of the wealthiest suburbs in Sydney), and after requests from students and parents at the time, the school decided to dispense with the compulsory school uniforms, making Mosman High one of only two state high schools at the time without a prescribed uniform (the other being Crestwood High School, which has since adopted a uniform).

== Notable alumni ==
- Christian Anthony – Musician
- Saskia Burmeister – Actress
- Simon Day – Singer
- Maeve Dermody – Actress
- Ken Done AM – Artist
- Flume – Musician
- Ralph Heimans AM – Artist
- David Le'aupepe – Musician
- Barton Lynch – Surfer
- Erin McKinnon – AFLW player
- Shimon Moore – Singer & songwriter
- Andrew Mueller – Writer
- Joe Stimson – NRL player
- Naomi Watts – Actress

== See also ==
- List of government schools in New South Wales
