= Fritz Schupp =

German architect

Fritz Schupp (22 December 1896 in Uerdingen – 1 August 1974 in Essen) was a German architect. He was educated from 1914 to 1917 at the Universities of Karlsruhe, München and Stuttgart. Despite mostly working alone, he formed a partnership based in Essen and Berlin with Martin Kremmer. From 1949, Schupp was a lecturer at the Technical University in Hannover. Between 1920 and 1974, he built 69 factories and plants. In the Bergbauarchiv (Bochum), 17500 sketches are at the disposal of researchers. His best-known work was the Zollverein Coal Mine Industrial Complex, a UNESCO World Heritage Site since 2001.

== Works ==
- 1921: Zeche Holland 3/4/6 in Wattenscheid
- 1922: Mine's head offices Am Knie in Dortmund-Neuasseln
- 1927: Cock factory in Gelsenkirchen
- 1928–1930: Evangelist church in Berlin-Niederschöneweide
- 1928–1932: Plant Zeche Zollverein 12 in Essen
- vor 1930: Hall of „Zeche in Horst bei Essen“
- 1936: Over surface installations Rammelsberg in Goslar
- 1936: Monument for the victims of the Schlagwetter-Explosion in Flöz „Ida“ Zeche Adolf von Hansemann in Dortmund-Mengede
- 1938: Extension of the farm Schulte up der Hege in Werksfürsorge Zollverein
- 1936–1940: German Mining Museum in Bochum (with Heinrich Holzapfel)
- 1940–1951: Powerplant Gustav Knepper in Dortmund-Mengede
- 1944: Pit Zeche Germania in Dortmund-Marten (transformed in 1974 as a heritage of the Deutschen Bergbaumuseum in Bochum)
- 1948–1952: Pit Grimberg 1/2 in Bergkamen
- 1950: Tower Zeche Friedlicher Nachbar in Bochum-Linden
- 1953: Social offices of the Rammelsberg mine in Goslar
- 1953: Pit Zeche Pluto Wilhelm in Herne-Wanne
- 1954: Pit 7 of Zeche Ewald in Herten
- 1954: Aden house in Lünen
- 1955–1956: Tower over pit 2 der Zeche Lohberg in Dinslaken
- 1955–1959: Pit Katharina in Essen-Kray
- 1950er Jahre: Tower, hall and washing facilities of pit Hugo in Gelsenkirchen-Buer
- 1958–1960: Powerplant Springorum in Bochum-Weitmar
- 1960: Tower of the Zeche Vereinigte Dahlhauser Tiefbau pit in Bochum-Dahlhausen
- 1964: Concrete tower of pits 4 and 6 in Zeche Sophia-Jacoba in Ratheim

== More ==
- Wilhelm Busch: F. Schupp, M. Kremmer. Bergbauarchitektur 1919–1974. Rheinland-Verlag, Köln 1980, ISBN 3-7927-0568-0.
- Wilhelm Busch, Thorsten Scheer (Hrsg.): Symmetrie und Symbol. Die Industriearchitektur von Fritz Schupp und Martin Kremmer. Köln 2002, ISBN 3-88375-616-4.
