= The Coronation Theatre: Portrait of HM Queen Elizabeth II =

2012 painting by Ralph Heimans

- Artist: Ralph Heimans
- Year: 2012
- Type: Painting
- Medium: Oil on canvas
- Subject: Queen Elizabeth II
- Dimensions: 250 cm × 342 cm (98 in × 135 in)
- Location: Westminster Abbey, London

The Coronation Theatre: Portrait of HM Queen Elizabeth II (250 cm × 342 cm (98 in × 135 in), oil on canvas) was painted by Ralph Heimans in 2012 to mark the Diamond Jubilee of Queen Elizabeth II. While the sitting took place in Buckingham Palace, the Queen is portrayed in Westminster Abbey, standing at the centre of the Cosmati pavement where she had been crowned 60 years previously. The mosaic pavement, referred to by Shakespeare as "the floor of heaven", is rich in symbolism and was created to evoke the "eternal pattern of the universe". It has been an integral part of the coronation ceremony since Henry III of England and is where every English monarch (except for Edward V and Edward VIII) has been crowned for the last 900 years.

The Queen is depicted wearing a state dress beneath the crimson Robe of State, which she wore to her coronation 60 years previously and which she has worn to the opening of state parliament each year since. Her diamond necklace and earrings, were made by Garrard & Co, jewellers for Queen Victoria's coronation, and were worn by Queen Elizabeth on the day of her coronation in 1953.

The portrait was publicly unveiled on 28 September 2012 by The Governor General of Australia, Dame Quentin Bryce at the National Portrait Gallery of Australia. The portrait formed the centre piece of the Diamond Jubilee Exhibition, "Glorious", where it drew record numbers of visitors to the gallery.

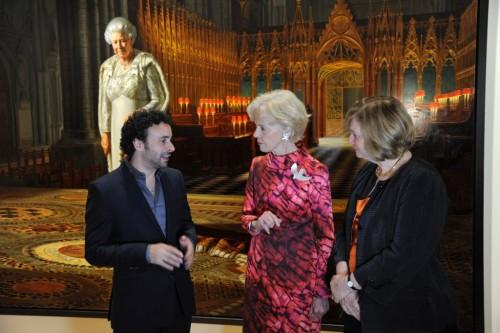
Artist Ralph Heimans and Governor-General Dame Quentin Bryce at the unveiling at the National Portrait Gallery of Australia in Canberra, 2012

In 2013, Westminster Abbey acquired the portrait through the generosity of Lord Harris of Peckham. Whilst on display in the Chapter House in Westminster Abbey as part of their Coronation Display, the portrait was vandalised by a Fathers for Justice campaigner who struggled with the security guard as he sprayed the word "Help" across the painting in purple paint. The protester was sentenced to 6 months in prison.

The portrait was restored by the Westminster Abbey restoration team and is now on permanent display in the newly opened Diamond Jubilee Gallery in the Triforium of the Abbey.

== See also ==
- HRH The Duke of Edinburgh (Ralph Heimans portrait)
- HRH The Prince of Wales (Ralph Heimans portrait)
