= HRH The Prince of Wales (Ralph Heimans portrait) =

2018 painting by Ralph Heimans

- Artist: Ralph Heimans
- Year: 2018
- Type: Painting
- Medium: Oil on canvas
- Subject: Charles, Prince of Wales (later Charles III)
- Dimensions: 188 cm × 252 cm (74 in × 99 in)

HRH The Prince of Wales, also known as HM King Charles III, is a 2018 portrait of Charles, Prince of Wales (later Charles III) by the Australian-British painter Ralph Heimans (b. 1970). It was unveiled at Australia House in London to mark the Prince's 70th birthday. The work, set in Dumfries House in Scotland, focuses on the Prince's commitment to environmental protection and sustainability, architectural preservation and the notions of harmony between the natural world and the built environment. The portrait is part of the Royal Collection and will be on display in Dumfries House. Charles is depicted in the tapestry room at the house, wearing a grey suit and holding a wooden cane.

== See also ==
- The Coronation Theatre: Portrait of HM Queen Elizabeth II
- HRH The Duke of Edinburgh (Ralph Heimans portrait)
