= Statue of Peyton Manning =

Public sculpture in Indianapolis, Indiana, US

- The statue in 2024
- Medium: Bronze sculpture
- Subject: Peyton Manning
- Location: Indianapolis, Indiana, U.S.; 39.7613°N 86.1625°W

A statue of Peyton Manning by Ryan Feeney is installed outside Lucas Oil Stadium, in Indianapolis, Indiana. The 9-foot-tall bronze sculpture weighs 1,000 pounds (450 kg). An estimated 10,000 to 12,000 people attended the unveiling in 2017. Manning attended, and speakers at the ceremony included Tony Dungy, Bill Polian, and NFL Commissioner Roger Goodell. Manning asked that he be depicted wearing a helmet.

== See also ==
- 2017 in art
- List of public art in Indianapolis
