= Zollverein Coal Mine Industrial Complex =

Large former industrial site in the city of Essen, North Rhine-Westphalia, Germany

Zollverein Coal Mine Industrial Complex in Essen
UNESCO World Heritage Site
- Zollverein Coal Mine, shaft 12

- Location within Germany Location within North Rhine-Westphalia
- Location: Essen, North Rhine-Westphalia, Germany
- Criteria: Cultural: (ii), (iii)
- Reference: 975
- Inscription: 2001 (25th Session)
- Website: www.zollverein.de
- Coordinates: 51°29′29″N 07°02′46″E

Zollverein Coal Mine Industrial Complex, Essen

The Zollverein Coal Mine Industrial Complex (German Zeche Zollverein) is a large former industrial site in the city of Essen, North Rhine-Westphalia, Germany. The first coal mine on the premises was founded in 1847, and mining activities took place from 1851 until 23 December 1986. For decades, starting in the late 1950s, the two parts of the site, Zollverein Coal Mine and Zollverein Coking Plant (erected 1957–1961, closed on 30 June 1993), ranked among the largest of their kinds in Europe. Shaft 12, built in the New Objectivity style, was opened in 1932 and is considered an architectural and technical masterpiece, earning it a reputation as the "most beautiful coal mine in the world".

Because of its architecture and testimony to the development of heavy industry in Europe, the industrial complex was inscribed on the UNESCO World Heritage List on 14 December 2001, and is one of the anchor points of the European Route of Industrial Heritage.

== History ==
=== 1847–1890 ===
Zollverein Coal Mine was founded by Duisburg-born industrialist Franz Haniel (1779–1868), who needed coke for steel production. Test drilling in the Katernberg region had revealed a very rich seam of coal. In 1847, Haniel founded a company he named bergrechtliche Gewerkschaft Zollverein (Mining Law Labor Union Zollverein). There was a mining law (Bergrecht) in Prussia to encourage the exploitation of natural resources. The law called for the creation of a special form of corporation, designated a 'labour union' (Gewerkschaft) but in fact a capitalist company. Haniel named his after the German Customs Union (Zollverein), established in 1834. Haniel distributed the shares of the new company amongst the members of his family and the owner of the land on which the future mine would be constructed.

The sinking of Shaft 1 began on 18 February 1847, with the first coal layer being reached at a depth of 130 meters. The first mining activities started in 1851. Shaft 2, which was sunk at the same time as Shaft 1, was opened in 1852. Both shafts featured visually identical stone towers and shared a machine house. This concept was to be adapted by many later twin-shaft coal mines.

Starting in 1857, charcoal piles were used to produce coke. In 1866, these piles were replaced by a modern cokery and machine ovens.

In 1880, the sinking of another shaft, Shaft 3, began in neighboring Schonnebeck. It had a steel framework to support its winding tower and was opened in 1883. By 1890, the three shafts had already achieved an output of one million tons, making Zollverein the most productive of all German mines.

=== 1890–1918 ===
Since the coal, iron and steel industries of the Ruhr area flourished in the late 19th and early 20th centuries, the mine was extended significantly.

Between 1891 and 1896, the twin Shafts 4 and 5 were built on the edge of Heßler (nowadays a suburb of Gelsenkirchen). These each had special lifts for the extraction of coal, and the transportation of miners, and had ventilation ducts. Another shaft, number 6, was opened in 1897.

By 1897, Zollverein had long suffered from many mining accidents due to firedamp caused by ventilation problems. To resolve these problems, additional ventilation-only shafts, close to the existing mining shafts, were opened: in 1899 Shaft 7 was opened near Shaft 3, in 1900 Shaft 8 was opened near Shafts 1 and 2, and in 1905 Shaft 9 was opened near Shaft 6.

Years of continuous renovation and further expansion followed. After the construction of ventilation shafts 7, 8, and 9, the old Shafts 1 and 2, and their cokery, were renovated, and one of their twin towers was taken down and replaced by a modern steel framework. In 1914, Shaft 10 and a new cokery were opened, and Shaft 9 was converted from a ventilation shaft to a working shaft.

By the eve of the First World War, Zollverein's output had risen to approximately 2.5 million tons per year.

=== 1918–1932 ===
In 1920, the Haniel family, who had been the owners of Zollverein until then, started cooperating with Phönix AG, a mining company that subsequently took over the management of the site. Under Phönix's management, several of the shafts were again modernized, and an eleventh shaft was opened by 1927. When Phönix merged into Vereinigte Stahlwerke in 1926, Zollverein came under the control of Gelsenkirchener Bergwerks-AG (GBAG) which started closing most of the now elderly coking plants.

=== Shaft 12 ===
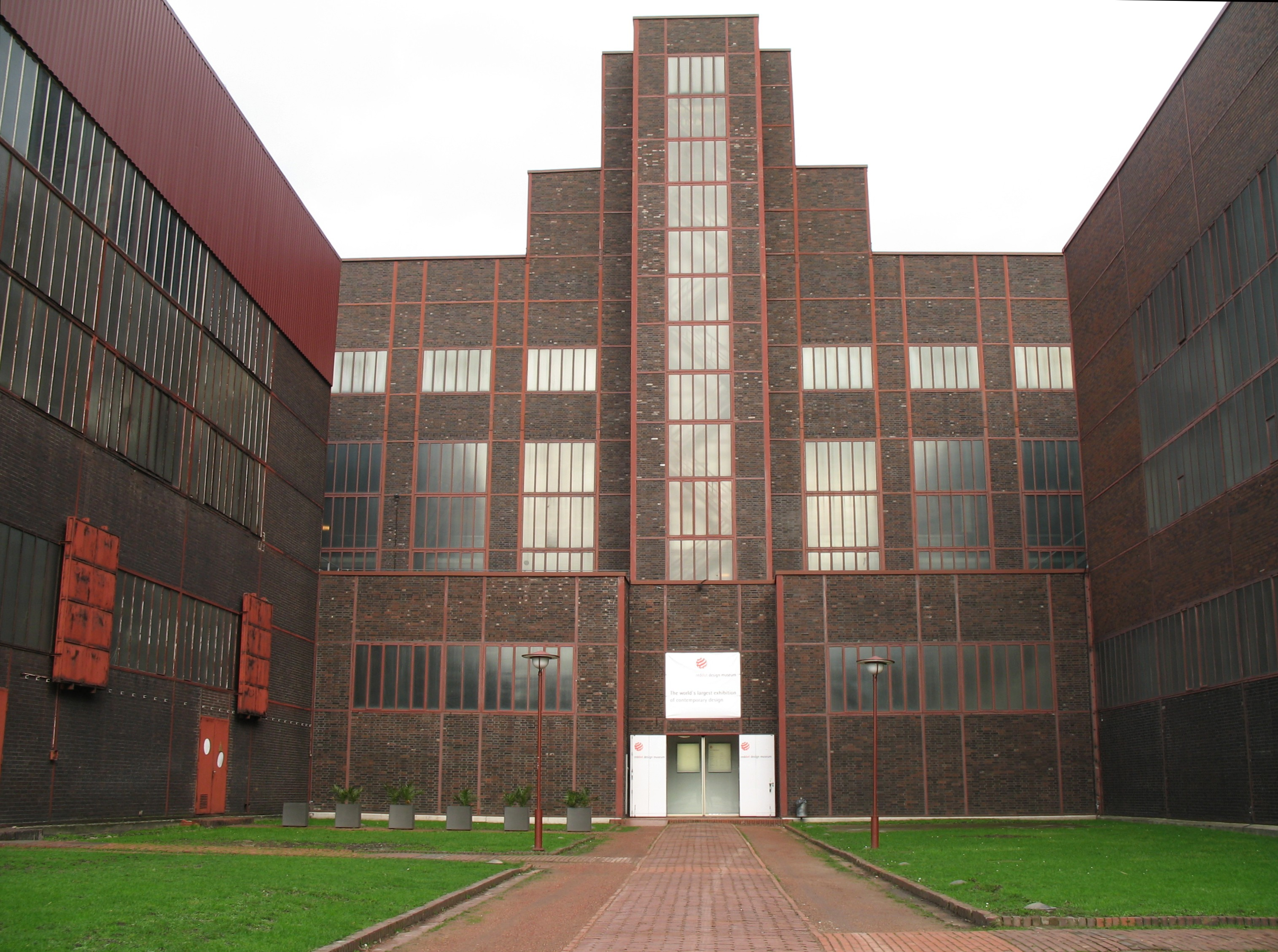
Former boiler house of Shaft 12 in the typical Bauhaus style with red steel trusses. Today it houses the Red Dot Design Museum.

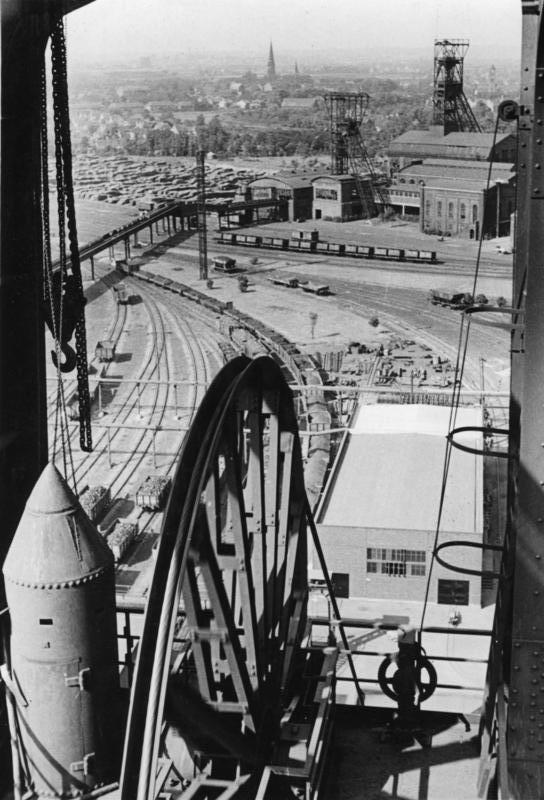
Zollverein, 1949

In 1928, the GBAG voted for the construction of a totally new twelfth shaft designed as a central mining facility. When the shaft opened in 1932, it had a daily output of up to 12,000 tons, combining the output of the four other existing facilities with 11 shafts.

Schacht Albert Vögler, as the highly modern shaft was named after the director general of the GBAG, was designed by the architects Fritz Schupp and Martin Kremmer and quickly gained notice for its simple, functional Bauhaus design with its mainly cubical buildings made of reinforced concrete and steel trusses.

The shaft's characteristic Doppelbock winding tower in the following years not only became the archetype of many later central mining facilities but also became a symbol of German heavy industry.

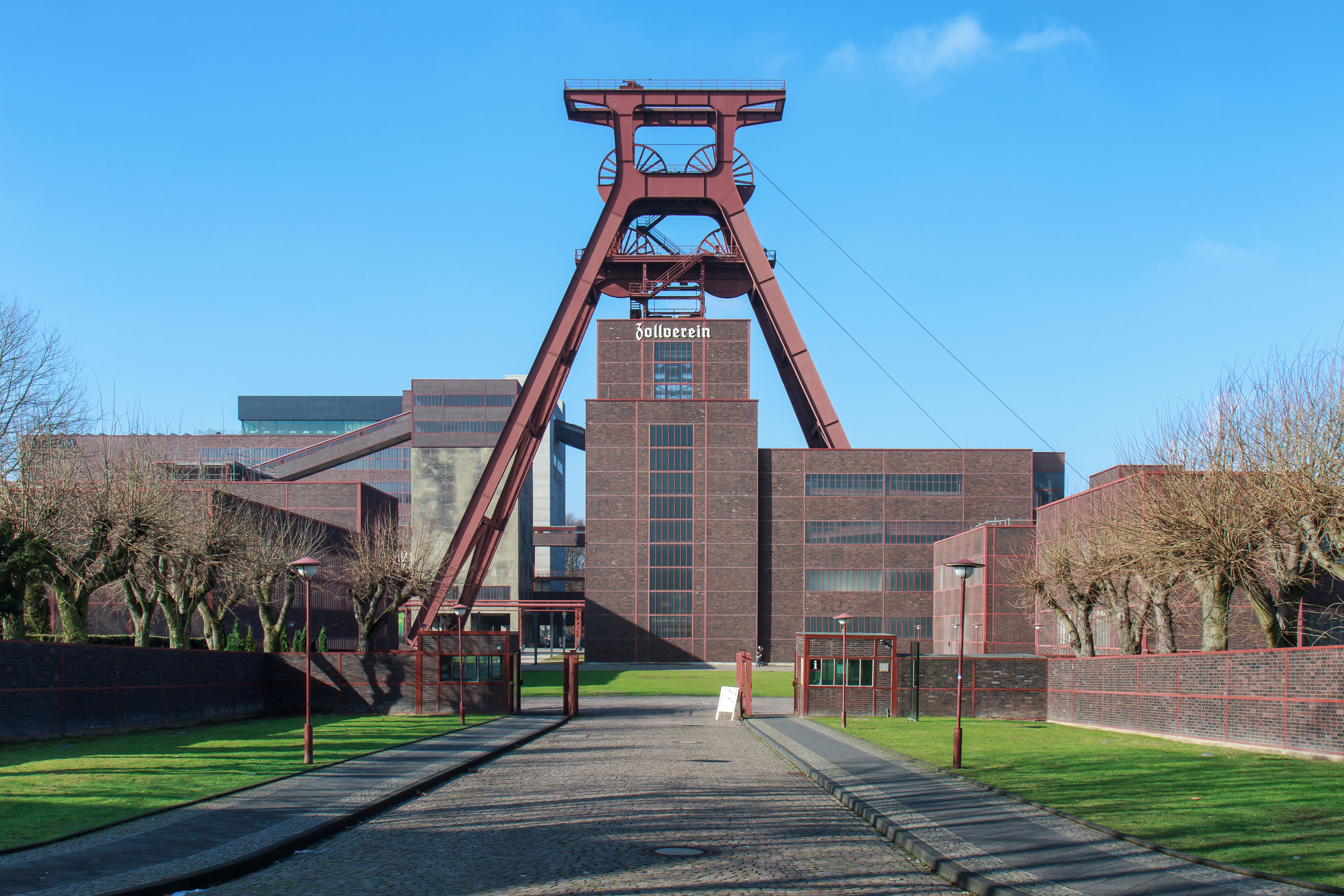
The winding tower of Shaft 12 with inscription Zollverein has become a well-known symbol of Essen and the whole Ruhr area.

Whilst this symbol may have slowly been forgotten when German heavy industry started diminishing in the second half of the 20th century, it was this shaft and especially its characteristic winding tower that were to become a symbol of the Ruhr area's structural change.

=== 1932–1968 ===
In 1937, Zollverein employed 6900 people and had an output of 3.6 million tons, the majority of which was contributed by the new 12th shaft. The other shafts were not entirely closed, and some, such as Shaft 6, even received new winding towers (though in comparison to Shaft 12 they were far inferior). On the premises of the old coking plant of Shafts 1, 2 and 8, a small facility of 54 new ovens was opened with a yearly output of 200,000 tons of coke.

Zollverein survived the Second World War with only minor damage and by 1953 again placed on top of all German mines, with an output of 2.4 million tons. In 1958, Shaft 1 was replaced by a totally new building; The complete reconstruction of the 2/8/11 shaft facility from 1960 until 1964 was again planned by Fritz Schupp. However, these renovations were to last only until 1967, when 11 shafts were closed, leaving Shaft 12 the only open one.

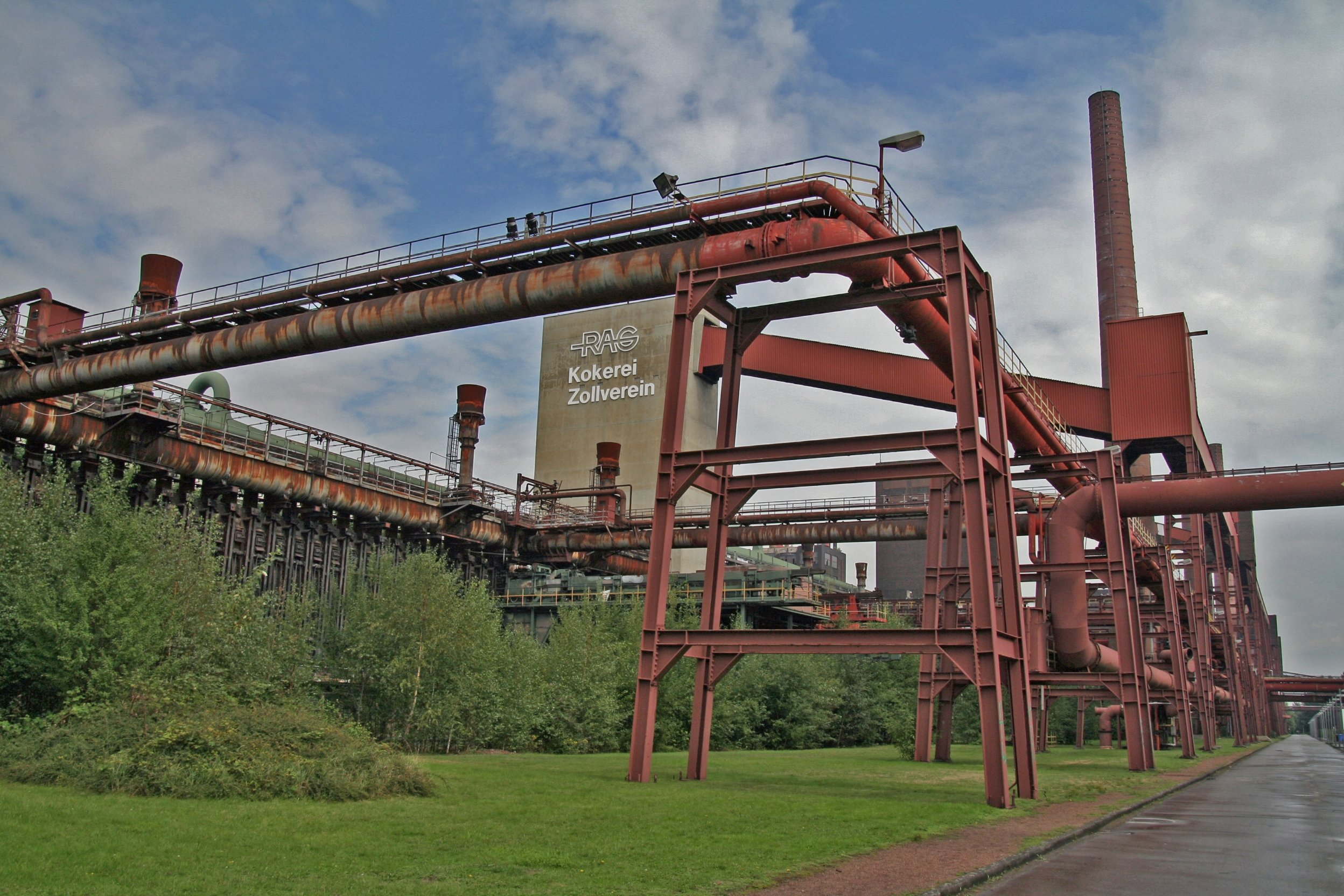
Zollverein coking plant

Shaft 12 thus became the main supplier of the new central coking plant from 1961 with its 192 ovens, which was again designed by Fritz Schupp. After an expansion in the early 1970s, Zollverein placed among the most productive coking plants worldwide with around 1,000 workers and an output of up to 8,600 tons of coke a day on the so-called dark side. The white side of the plant produced side products such as ammonia, raw benzene and raw tar.

In 1968, Zollverein was handed over to Ruhrkohle AG (RAG), Germany's largest mining company.

=== 1968–1993 ===
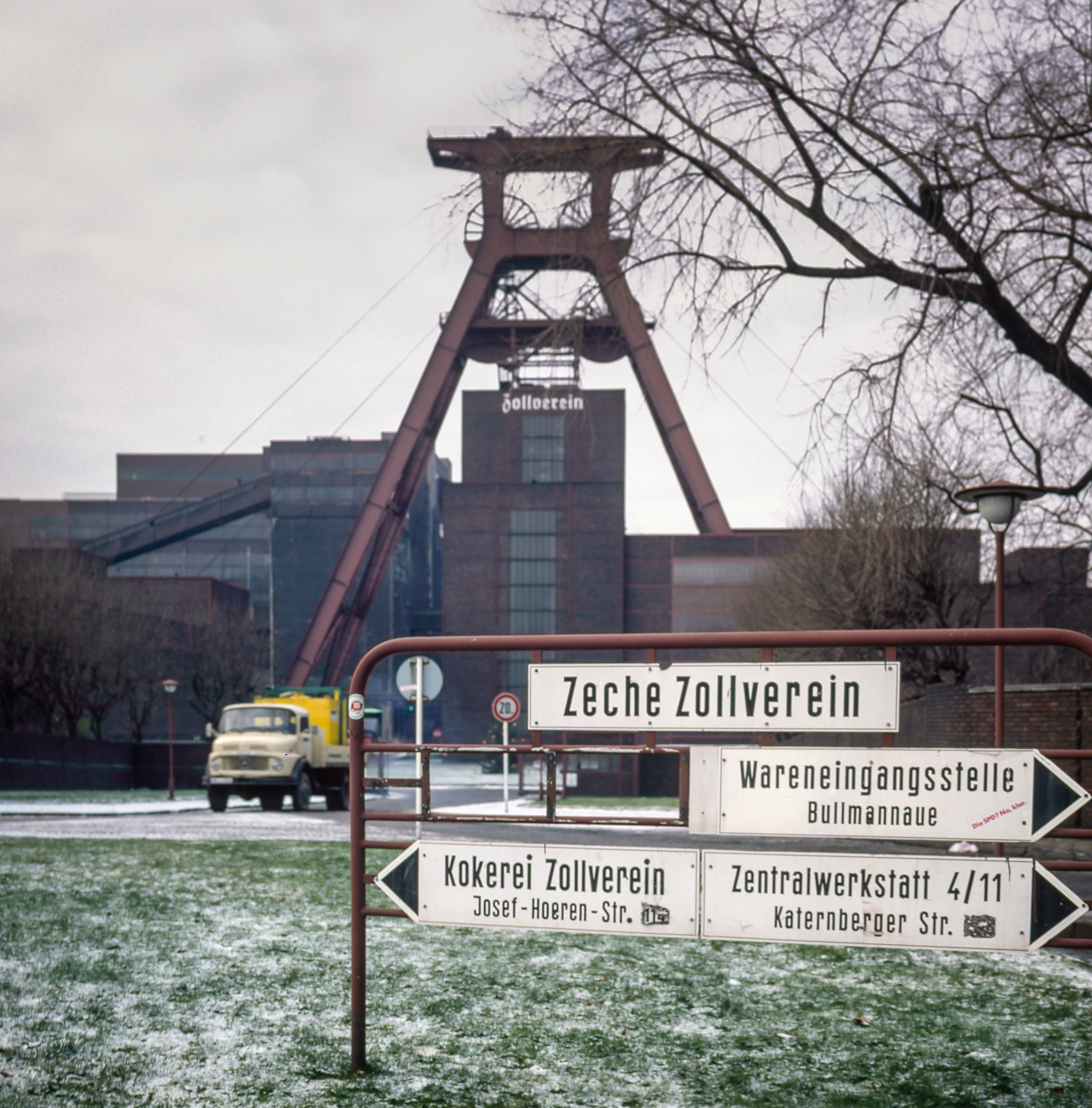
23 December 1986: Final working day

RAG began a further mechanization and consolidation of mining activities. In 1974, Zollverein was joined into a Verbundbergwerk (joined mines) with nearby Bonifacius and Holland coal mines in Kray and Gelsenkirchen, respectively. In 1982, Gelsenkirchen's Nordstern coal mine also joined that Verbund.

The Flöz Sonnenschein coal layer in the north of the Zollverein territory was the last layer in which mining activities took place on Zollverein territory, starting in 1980. The output of Verbundbergwerk Nordstern-Zollverein was approximately 3.2 million tons, but this did not prove profitable enough and a complete closure of the Zollverein site was voted for in 1983.

When it closed, Zollverein was the last remaining active coal mine in Essen. Whereas the coking plant remained open until 30 June 1993, mining activities in Shaft 12 stopped on 23 December 1986. Although it is the central shaft of the Cultural Heritage site, Shaft 12 cannot be visited as it is equipped for water drainage as part of a system of managing mine water in the central Ruhr area together with Shaft 2. Pipes have been inserted into both shafts and the remaining space has been backfilled with concrete.

=== 1993– ===
Zollverein is one of the settings for the 2014 Pulitzer Prize winning novel All the Light We Cannot See by Anthony Doerr.

Zollverein appeared as a "Wonder" in the video game Civilization VI, representing the Ruhr Valley.

=== Becoming a monument ===
As with most sites of the heavy industries that had been closed down, Zollverein was predicted to face a period of decay. Surprisingly, the state of North Rhine-Westphalia (NRW) bought the coal mine territory from the RAG immediately after it had been closed down in late 1986, and declared Shaft 12 a heritage site. This went along with the obligation to preserve the site in its original state and to minimize the effects of weathering. In 1989, the city of Essen and NRW founded the Bauhütte Zollverein Schacht XII that should take care for the site and which was replaced by the Stiftung Zollverein (Zollverein Foundation) in 1998.

After it had been closed down in 1993, the coking plant was planned to be sold to China. The negotiations failed and it was subsequently threatened to be demolished. However, another project of the state of NRW set the coal mine on a list of future exhibition sites resulting in first gentle modifications and the cokery also became an official heritage site in 2000.

On its 25th session in December 2001, the United Nations Educational, Scientific and Cultural Organization (UNESCO) declared both the sites of Shafts 12 and 1/2 and the cokery a World Heritage Site.

=== Ruhr Museum ===
The Ruhr Museum in the former coal washery, located on the UNESCO World Heritages Site Zollverein, is the regional museum of the Ruhr Area. In its permanent exhibition the Ruhr Museum presents, with over 6,000 exhibits, the history of one of the largest industrial regions of the world, from the formation of coal 300 million years ago to the contemporary situation. The Ruhr Museum has extensive collections on the geology, archaeology, industrial and social history as well as photography of the Ruhr area. In addition to its permanent exhibition, the Ruhr Museum regularly shows special exhibitions and offers a diverse programme with workshops, guided tours, excursions, lectures, movie nights and audio guides.

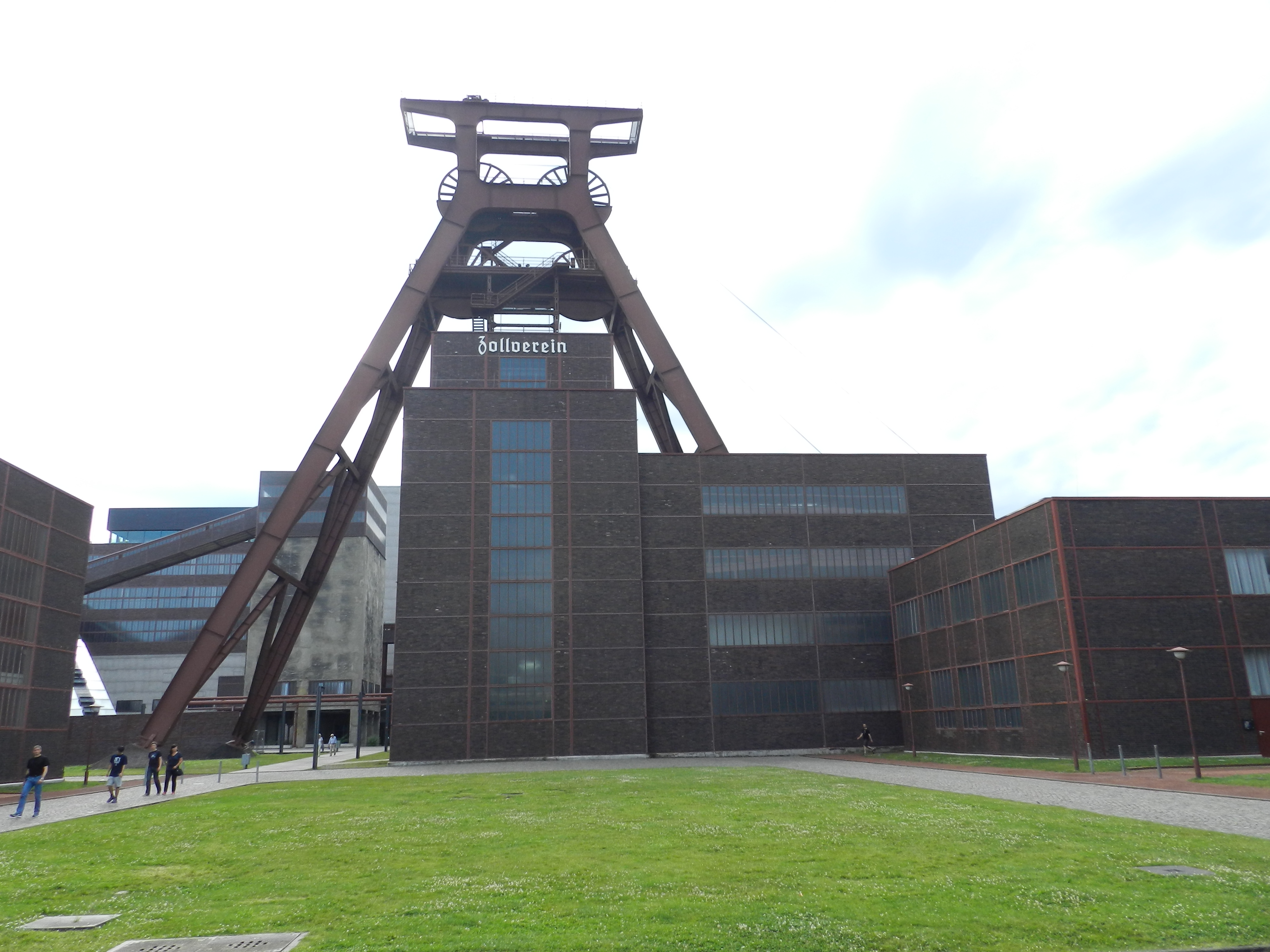
Historic former coal mine in the city of Essen in North Rhine Westphalia

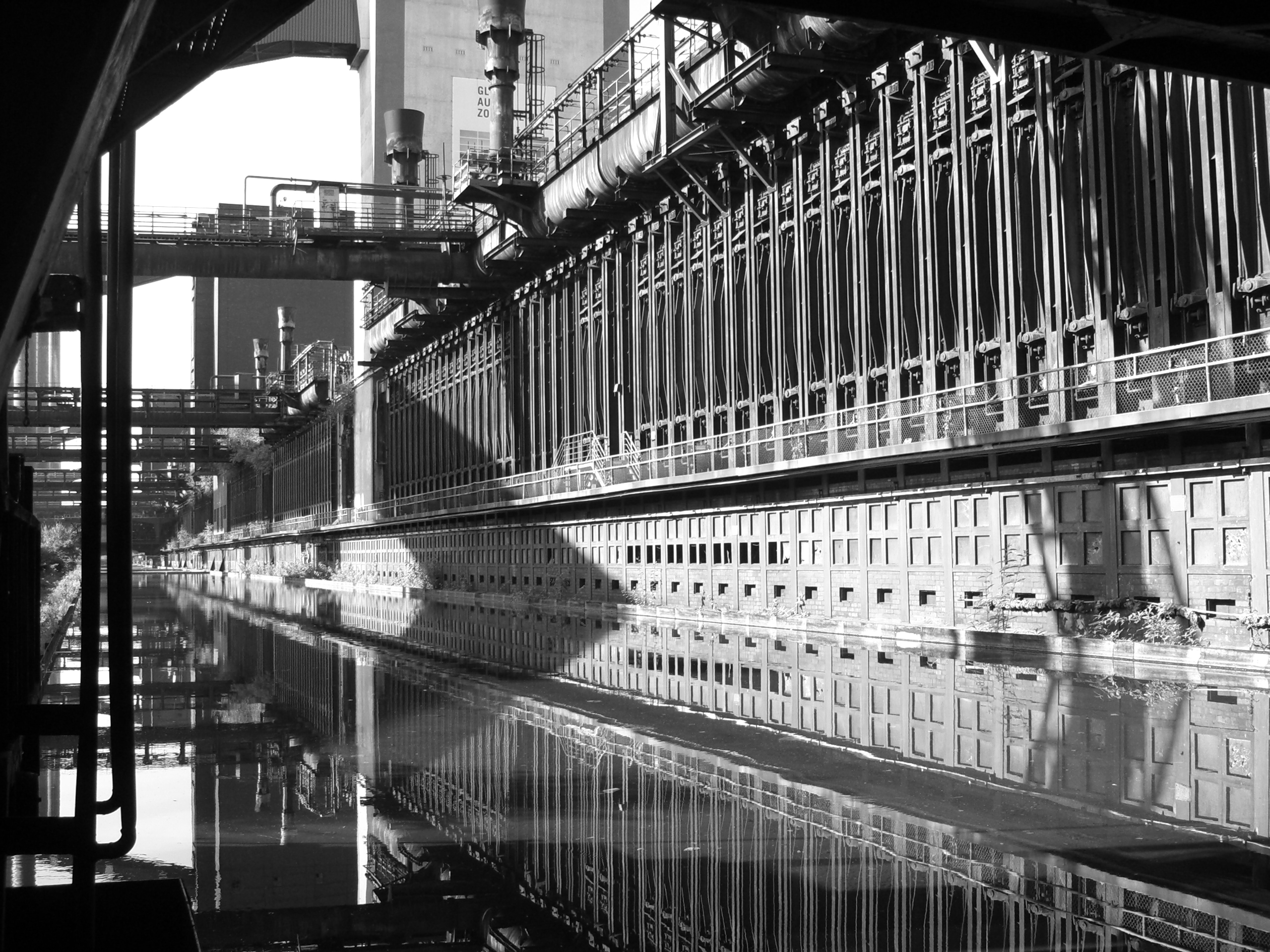
The coking plant, a “no-go-area” until mid-1993. The artificial channel is opened for ice skating in the winter.

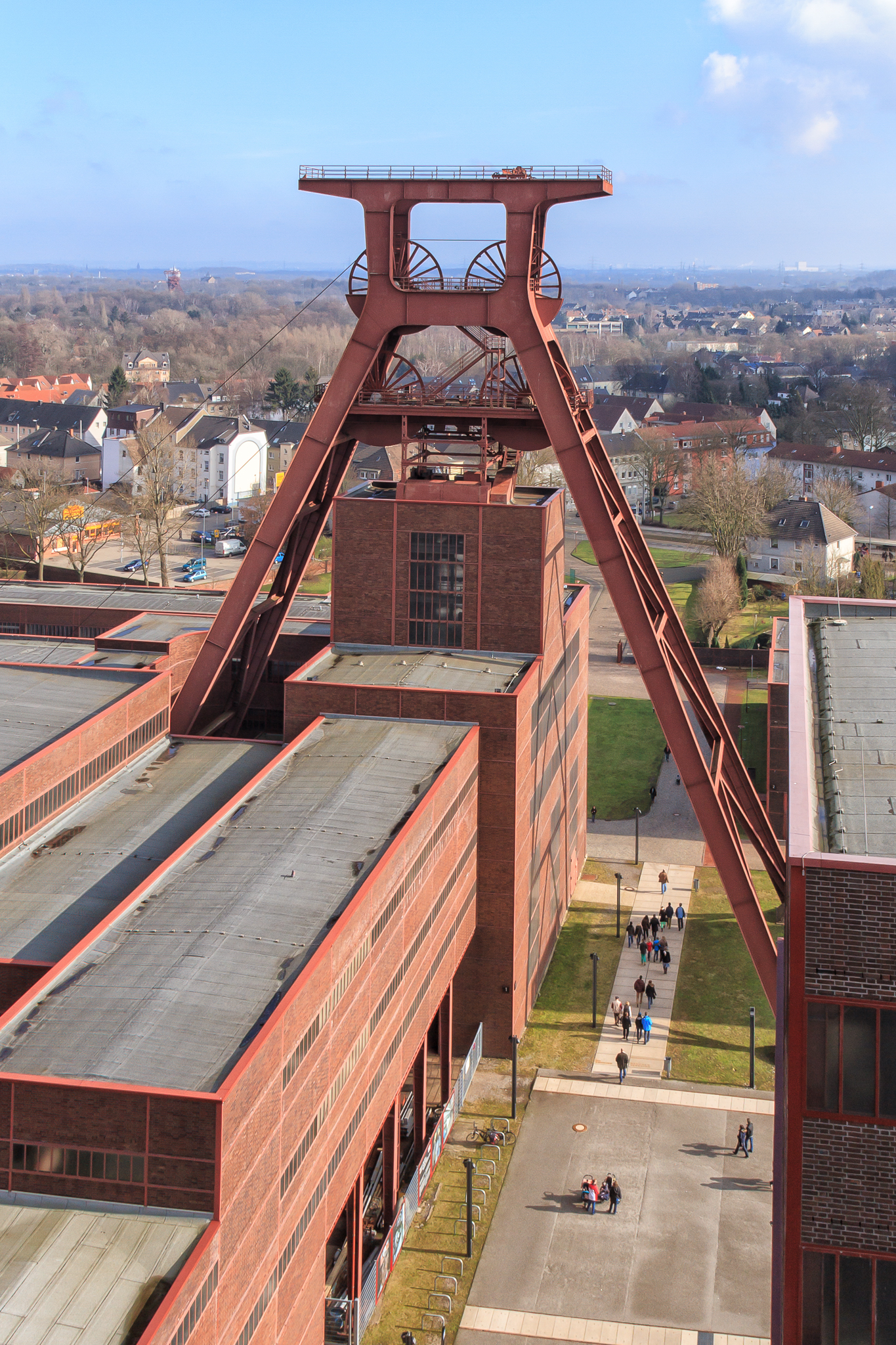
Rear view of shaft 12

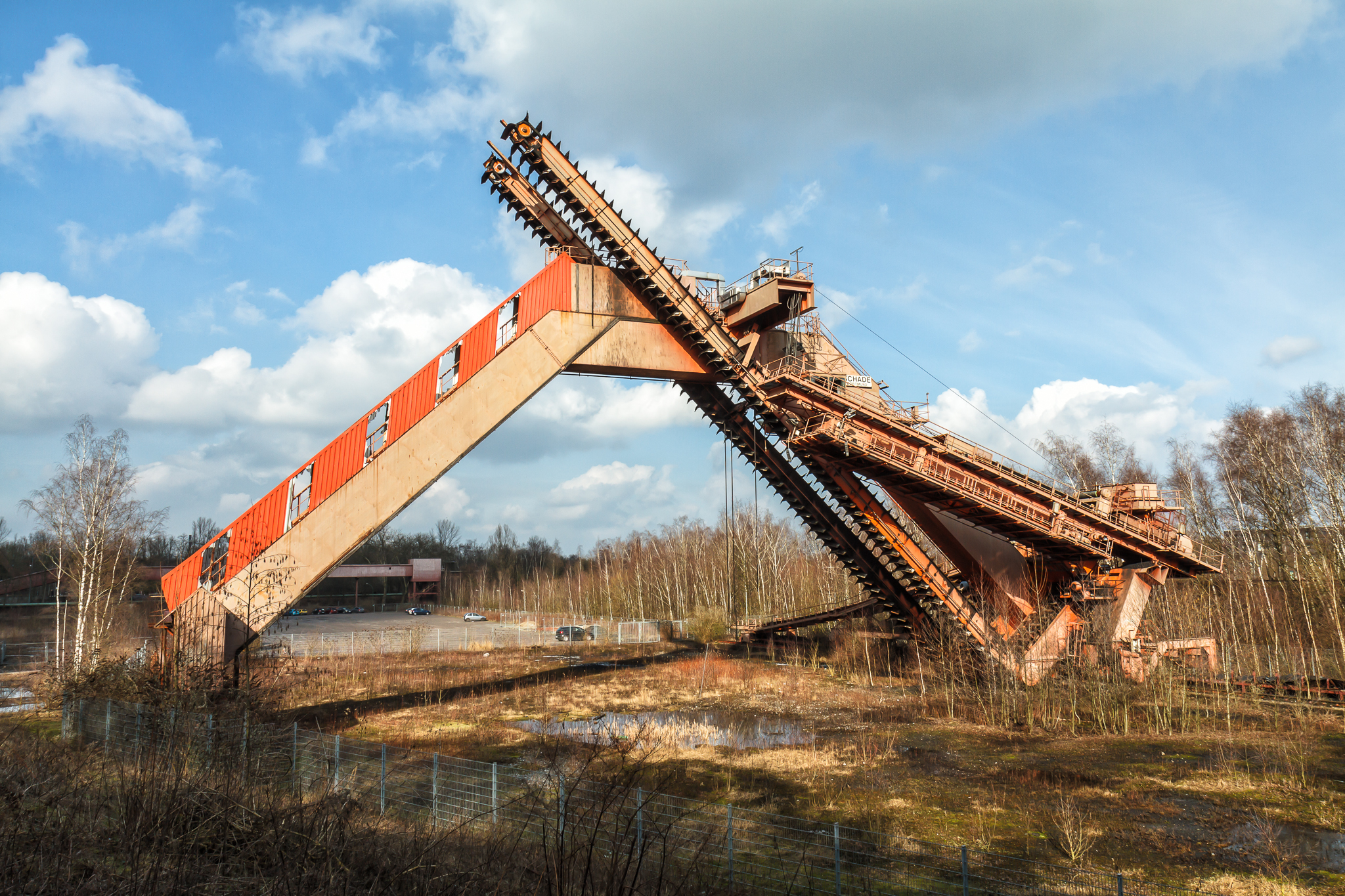
Stacker-reclaimer

Escalator to former coal washing plant

== Further Attractions ==
Coal cube in the former mixing hall (2026)

=== Escalators ===
The escalators - installed in 2006 and each approximately 58 meters long, with one for the ascent and one for the descent - underwent a comprehensive overhaul and renovation in 2024. Each was fitted with 558 new steps; they connect the site grounds to the visitor center - located at a height of 24 meters - providing access to the Coal Washery, the Ruhr Museum, Café Kohlenwäsche, and the Walther König bookstore. They are custom-made units from ThyssenKrupp Elevator. The concept was developed by the Rotterdam-based Office for Metropolitan Architecture (OMA).

The installation is considered the tallest freestanding escalator in Germany, with each ascent or descent taking 90 seconds.

=== Coal Cube ===
Located in the former 35-meter-high mixing hall of the Zollverein Coking Plant (near the visitor center) is a coal cube weighing 7.2 tonnes with an edge length of 1.60 meters; it is considered the largest single piece of coal in the world. It was manually extracted in March 2016 at the Prosper-Haniel mine in Bottrop from seam G 2/F at a depth of 1,140 meters.
