= Zeppelin Museum Friedrichshafen =

Aerospace museum

Coordinates: 47°39′02″N 9°28′59″E

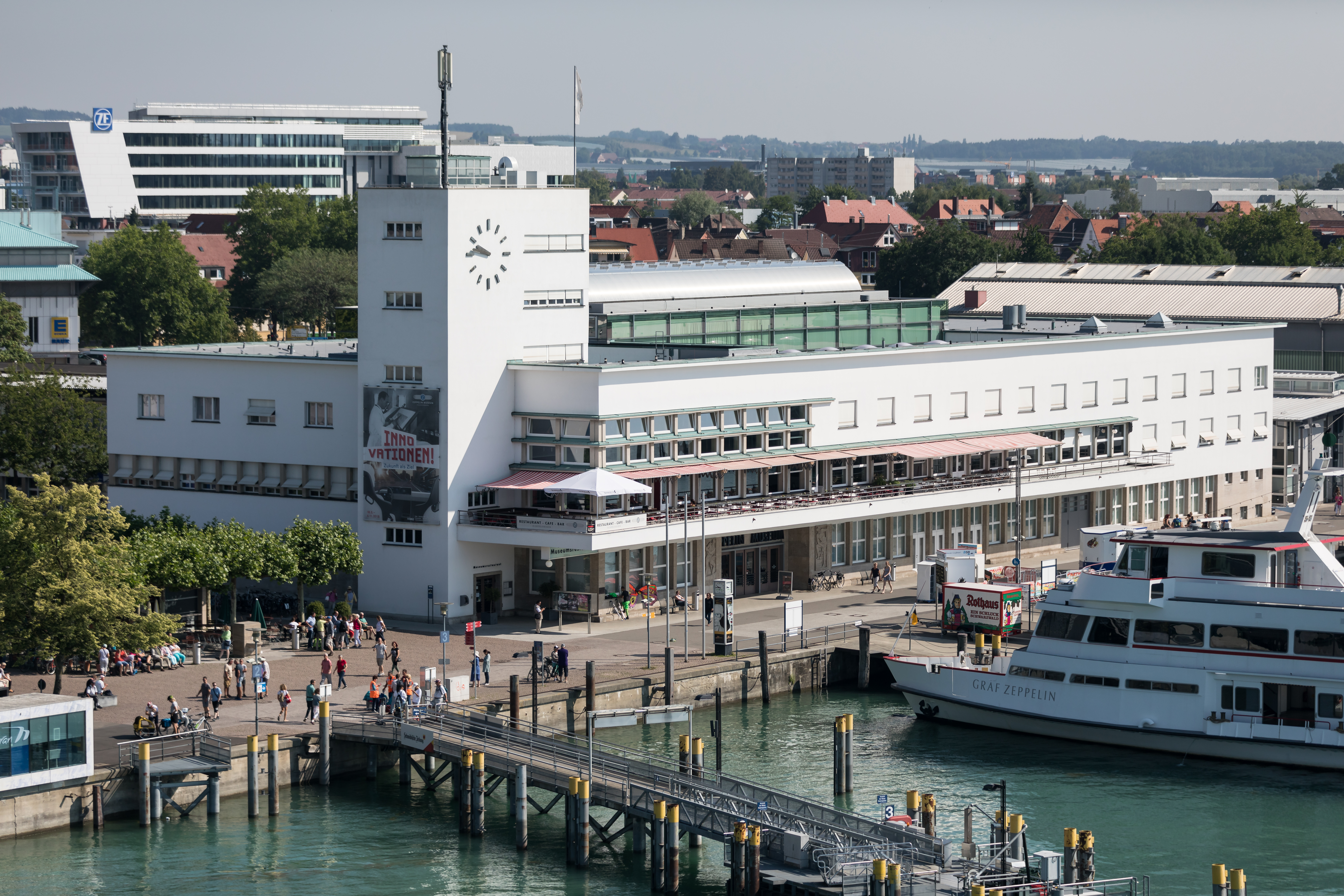
- Zeppelin Museum Friedrichshafen
- Established: 1996
- Location: Friedrichshafen, Baden-Württemberg, Germany
- Architect: HG Merz
- Website: zeppelin-museum.de/en

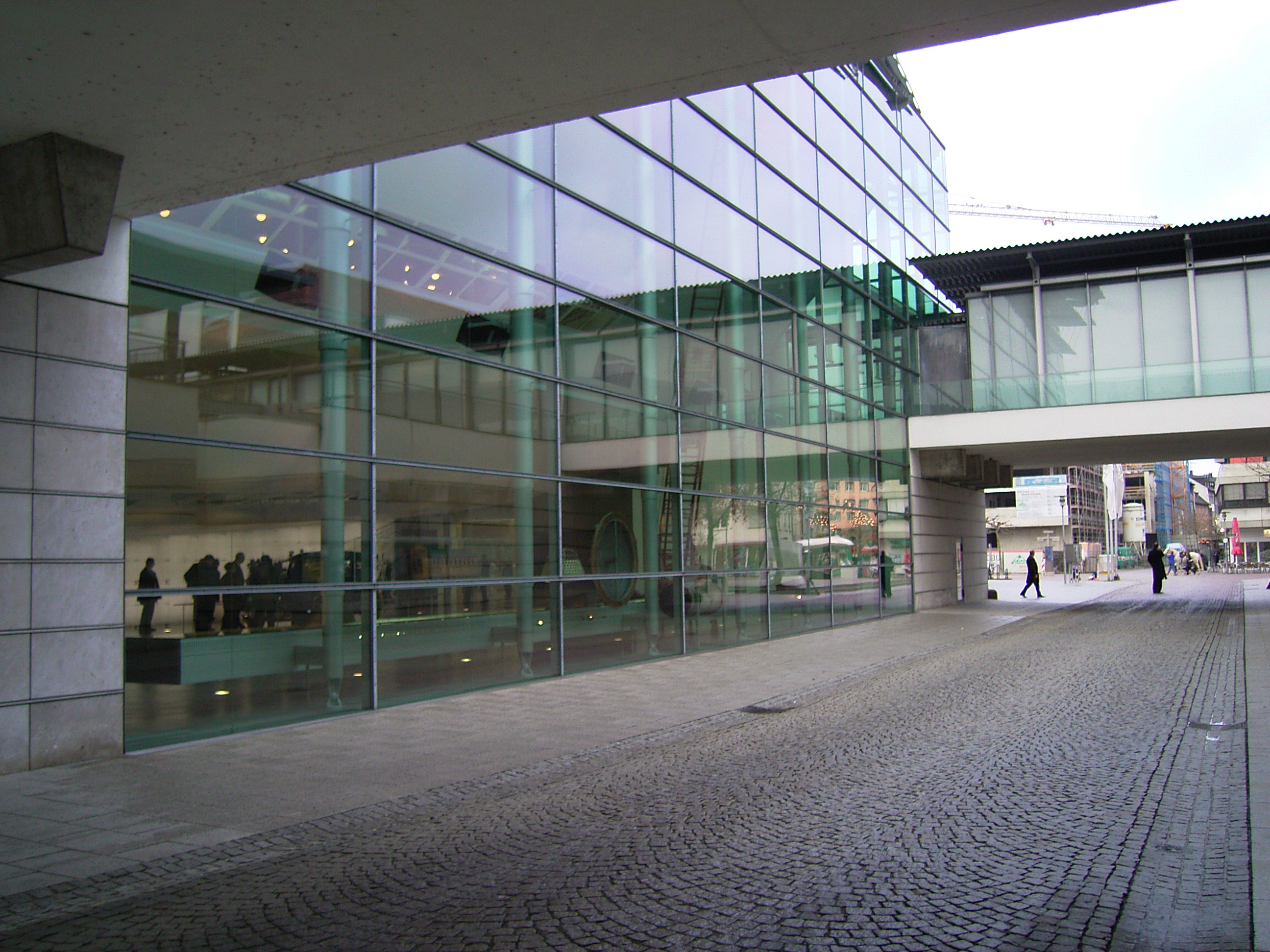
Rear view of the Zeppelin Museum. The glass wall and twin elevated walkways are later additions to the Hafenbahnhof.

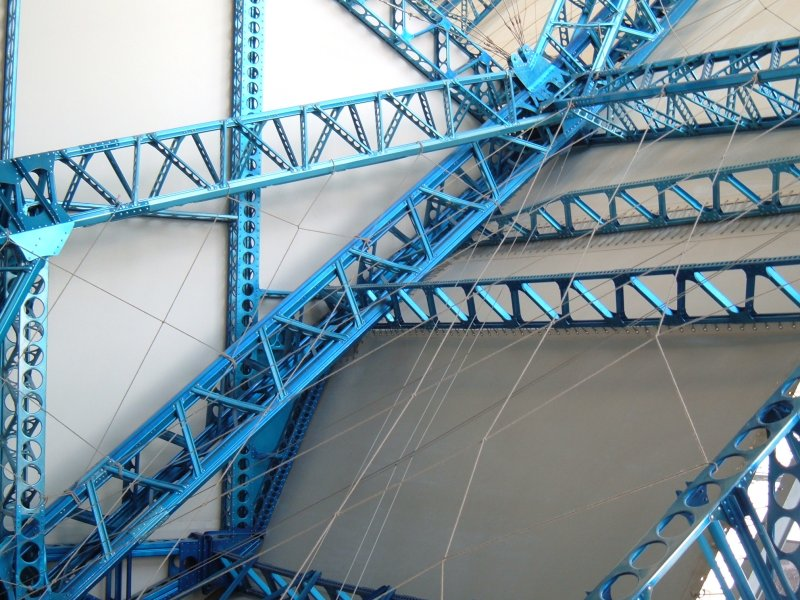
Structure of the partial Hindenburg replica

The Zeppelin Museum Friedrichshafen is a museum in Friedrichshafen in Germany, the birthplace of the Zeppelin airship. The museum houses the largest collection on airship travel in the world, and chronicles the history of the Zeppelin airships. The museum has been in its current location at the Hafenbahnhof (harbour railway station) since it was reopened in 1996. The exhibition was designed by HG Merz.

== Museum concept ==
In keeping with the museum concept of "Technology and Art", visitors can see for themselves how closely these two areas are related. The work of art Zeppelin Swarms by Héctor Zamora illustrates this particularly well. The art collection also includes works by those identified as degenerate artists by Nazi Germany, such as Otto Dix.

== Technology collection ==
The centerpiece of the zeppelin displays is a full-scale, partial model of the airship LZ 129 Hindenburg. The exhibition also includes an original engine nacelle of the LZ 127 Graf Zeppelin airship and a Maybach Zeppelin car. A great number of airship models, not only from Germany, are also on display in the technology department.

=== LZ 129 Hindenburg ===
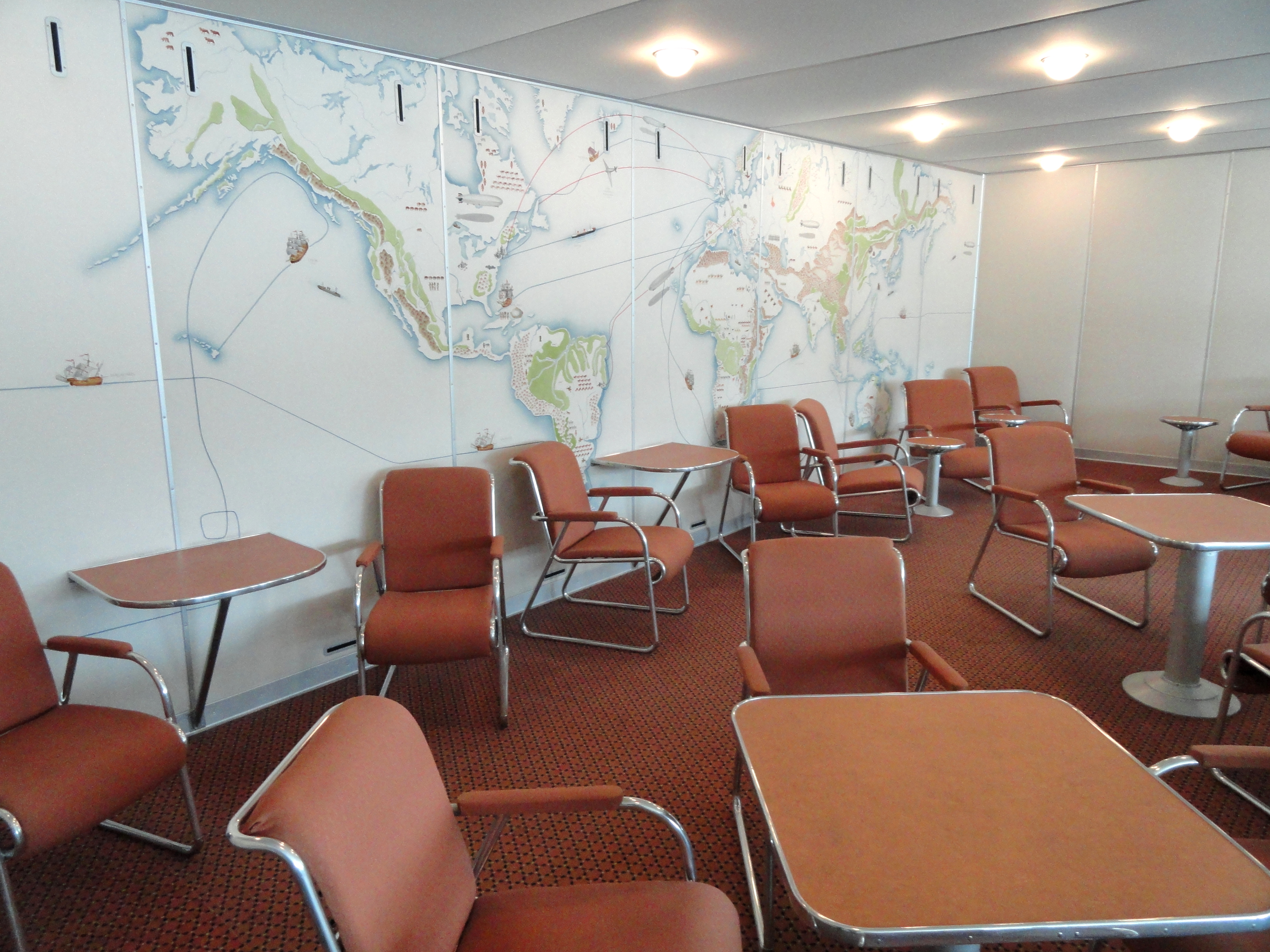
Recreated Cabin Lounge of Zeppelin Hindenburg in the Zeppelin Museum Friedrichshafen, Seestraße 22, Friedrichshafen, Germany

The centrepiece of the Zeppelin airship display is the full-scale, partial replica of the LZ 129 Hindenburg, which was reproduced true to the original and authentically furnished. It is 33 m in length.

The Hindenburg was 245 m long and had a maximum diameter of 41.2 m. It was propelled by four Daimler Benz diesel engines with a capacity of 772.3 kW (1050 hp) each, and reached a maximum speed of about 130 km/h.

After the overview of the partial model from the outside, the folded-down retractable aluminium stepladder allows visitors to go on board. It leads into the lower deck, the B-deck, which has a bar, a smokers’ lounge, and toilets. The passenger cabins are arranged on two decks, stacked one on top of the other. In the cabins, visitors can experience the ambience of a 1930s airship and get to know the technical aspects of this aircraft.

The beds inside the cabins are made of aluminium. Every cabin has a wall-hung wash basin (with running hot and cold water from a tap), a curtained wardrobe niche, a folding table, a stool, and a ladder for climbing into the upper bunk. The cabins also have electrical lighting and are ventilated and heated.

The Hindenburg travelled 18 times to North and South America. On 6 May 1937, while landing in Lakehurst, New Jersey, US the airship burst into flames just before touch-down and crashed.

=== Engine nacelle of the LZ 127 Graf Zeppelin ===
The nacelle was built in 1928 by the Luftschiffbau Zeppelin GmbH for the LZ 127 Graf Zeppelin (Count Zeppelin). The propulsion system of this airship consisted of five nacelles fixed to the hull. Every nacelle contained a Maybach engine, type VL 2, which drove a propeller at the nacelle’s tail. A mechanic was stationed at each engine at all times.

The nacelles had aluminium skeletons, the bottom halves of which were clad with aluminium sheeting and the tops with cotton cloth. A hatch, fitted with a connecting ladder to the main body of the airship, enabled the mechanics to climb in or out of the nacelles when their shifts changed.

=== Maybach Zeppelin ===
This Maybach Zeppelin was built in 1938 in Friedrichshafen. The car weighs 3.6 tons and can achieve a maximum speed of 170 km/h. Its engine has twelve cylinders with a total stroke volume of 8 litres and a capacity of 147 kW (200 hp). The engineering design for this car was based on the Maybach engines for the airships LZ 126 (1924) and LZ 127 Graf Zeppelin (1928).

=== Media room ===
The media room presents 3D historic photographs of zeppelins. In addition, historical footage can be played.

=== Zeppelin cabinet of curiosities ===
The cabinet hosts many small pieces of Zeppelin history: coins, porcelain, postal documents, tin toys and Zeppelin bibelot of all types.

=== Uplift, propulsion, aerodynamic ===
This wing of the museum is specially designed for children. Numerous experiments, original exhibits, and touchable replicas allow visitors to interact with the displays and try them out on their own.

== Art collection ==
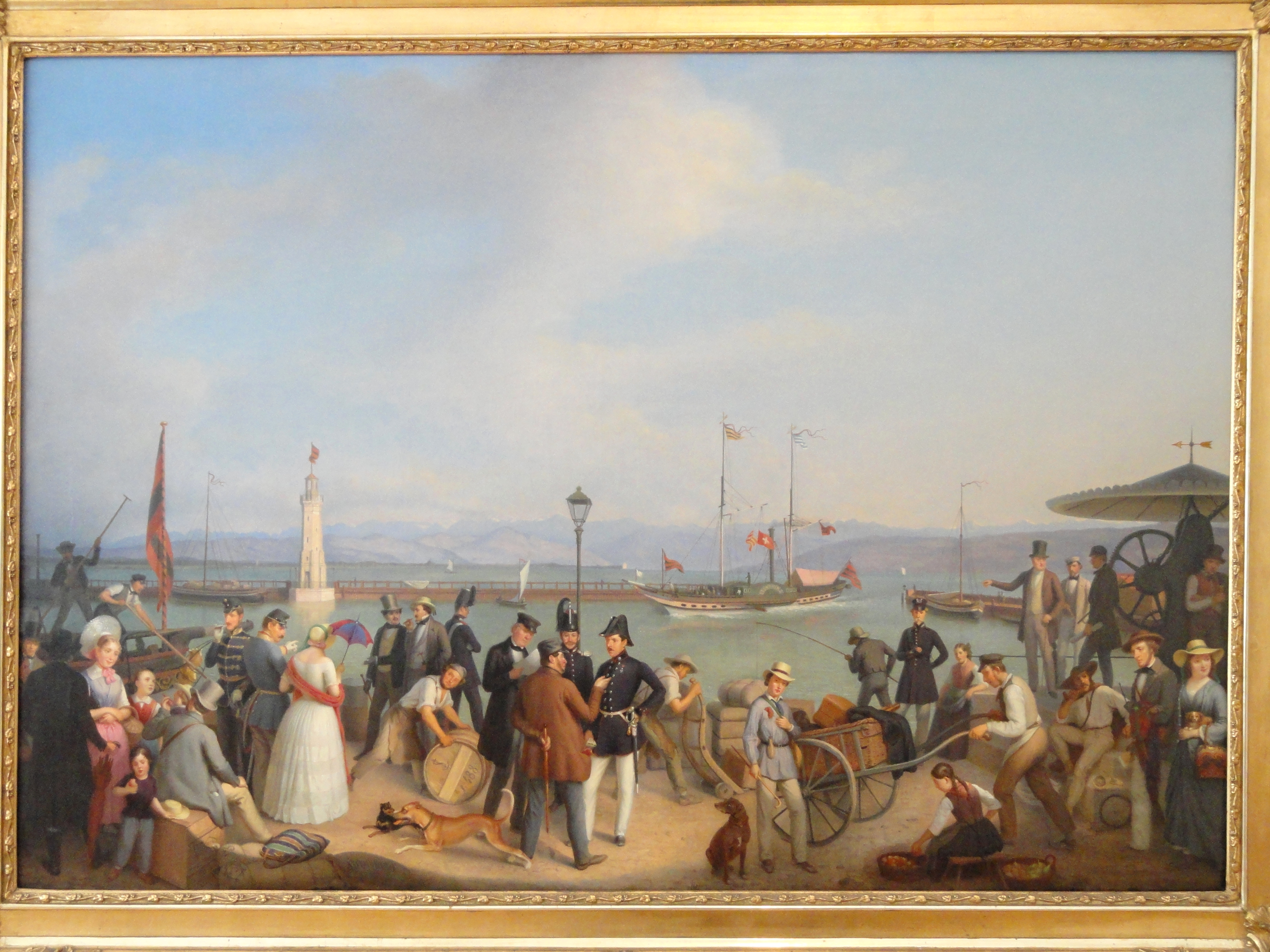
Einlaufen des Raddampfers ‘Kronprinz’ in den Hafen von Friedrichshafen, by Franz Seraph Stirnbrand, c. 1840. Exhibit in the Art Collection of the Zeppelin Museum Friedrichshafen, Seestraße 22, Friedrichshafen, Germany.

In the art collection, the connection between art and the subject of Zeppelins is established. The present collection was started in 1948, as the old museum had been completely destroyed by bombs during World War II. Of particular importance are works of art by artists who went into Inner Emigration at the time of the Third Reich and retired to the Lake Constance region such as Otto Dix, Max Ackermann, Willi Baumeister and Erich Heckel.

=== Héctor Zamora's Sciame de dirigibili – Zeppelin Swarms ===
The first of the art exhibits to be encountered in the museum, these little Zeppelins are part of the art work Zeppelin Swarms by Héctor Zamora.

=== Man and Technology – Man and Nature ===
The section Man and Technology demonstrates the high level of creativity and innovation that humans are capable of when it comes to technology and art. The focus is on man and his position in the interplay between technology, nature, and faith.

In the section Man and nature, it is shown that the relation between humans and nature is an emotional, aesthetic and religious connection, which changed over the centuries. The term "natural landscape" developed because of the industrialization and its impact on nature and landscape.

== Archive and library ==
The Zeppelin Collection and LZ Archives form a competency center on the history of German airship building, whilst the art department carries out research in the field of Lake Constance regional art and crafts.

=== LZ archive ===
The corporate archive of the Zeppelin airship-building limited company in Friedrichshafen fills a depot of the Zeppelin Museum. The archive stores documents on every business transaction of the company, from the beginnings to the 1960s. It also includes Count Zeppelin’s correspondence from the time he conceived his airship-building project. In addition, the archives contain the estates of important people in Zeppelin history such as Hugo Eckener, Hans von Schiller and Wilhelm Ernst Dörr. Collections of construction drawings, posters, prints, newspaper cuttings, photographs and films complete the collections.

=== Library ===
The library holds and collects publications on the subjects of the museum’s two departments. The bulk of the collection is composed of books and journals on the history and technology of regional, national, and international aviation; and on Zeppelin development; as well as biographies of the people and the stories of the companies involved in these fields. The library collects a great number and variety of art books and journals. The library is an open-shelf, non-lending library.
