= Liz Glynn =

American artist

- Born: 1981 (age 44–45); Boston, Massachusetts, United States
- Education: Harvard College (2003); California Institute of the Arts (2008)

Liz Glynn (born 1981) is an American artist. She is originally from Boston and now works out of Los Angeles. Much of her work is sculptural and installation-based, incorporating found objects and materials. Her work deals with institutional critique, collecting practices, antiquity, monument-building, and the concept of material value. Many of her installations encourage public engagement and participatory performance among her audiences. She is represented by Paula Cooper Gallery in New York.

== Early life and education ==
Glynn was born in Boston, Massachusetts. She received a Bachelor of Fine Arts in Visual and Environmental Studies at Harvard College in 2003. After college, she lived in Berlin and New York City, before moving to California to do her M.F.A. at CalArts. She graduated with a Masters of Fine Arts from the California Institute of the Arts in 2008.

== Work ==
=== Sculptural work ===
Glynn is known for replicating objects of antiquity with histories that she has researched extensively using minimal materials and in a somewhat primitive manner. The works are not about perfect replication or recreating an object with equivalent material value; instead she is more interested in the subjective and historical contexts that imbue the originals with their collective—and in some ways, arbitrary—worth. In an interview with Machine Project she states, "...for me, the proposition is not only that you could make a bad copy, but that you can make the copy however you would like to make it. So in a sense you can literally re-materialize your own history." Her first solo project RANSOM ROOM took place June 2 - July 28, 2014 in SculptureCenter with an opening reception on Sunday June 1, 5 - 7 pm. Glynn uses history to create her artwork. According to Artsy, “Her works have inspired by topics spanning a broad chronological and geographical spectrum, including the Egyptian Revolution, Buckminster Fuller’s Geodesic Domes, rare collections in the Metropolitan Museum, and the Trojan Empire.”

=== Installations ===
Similar to her sculptural work, Glynn's installations are composed of found and inexpensive materials and often index elements of political history, such as her installations that appear as public monuments. The underlying purpose of the installations is to engage her audiences both with the physical structure and with each other, providing a platform for social interaction. She has said of her installations, "Each of these projects reconstructs an epic narrative with 'poor' materials, and allows the audience to navigate through the space and situation through their own lived experience and conversations with fellow participants."

An example of her performative installations includes Black Box a speakeasy and official after-hours location for the Getty's Pacific Standard Time initiative. For 11 days, participants engaged in her licensed temporary bar in a vacant warehouse in West Hollywood. Similarly, her installation and pallet pyramid III invited audience participants to nine curated parties and performances that were decorated by Glynn's aesthetic of reconstructed antiquity.

In August 2026, Glynn’s Folly (1-2-3), was performed at the Storm King Art Center accompanying her sculpture installation Open House. Open House was originally a commission by the Public Art Fund in New York City and staged at the south end of Central Park, but the installation on the grounds of Storm King imbues the ruins with differing level of aristocratic ethos.

== Awards ==
Liz Glynn is the recipient of several awards including the Center for Cultural Innovation's Grant (2012), California Community Foundation Emerging Artist Fellowship (2010), and the Joan Mitchell Foundation Associate Artist Fellowship (2007). She won a Creative Capital award in 2016. Glynn was awarded the 2026 Rome prize from the American Academy in Rome to create sculpture combining traditional materials—plaster, stone, brick bronze, and clay—deployed in novel ways to mirror the acts of seizure, destruction, and recontextualization through new technologies.

== Exhibitions ==
Glynn has exhibited her work at LACMA, The Hammer Museum, The J. Paul Getty Museum, MOCA, L.A.C.E., and Frieze Art Fair.

Glynn participated in a series called 360 Speaker Series at the Nasher Sculpture Center.
