= Ruhr Museum =

Museum in Germany

Coordinates: 51°29′10″N 7°02′32″E

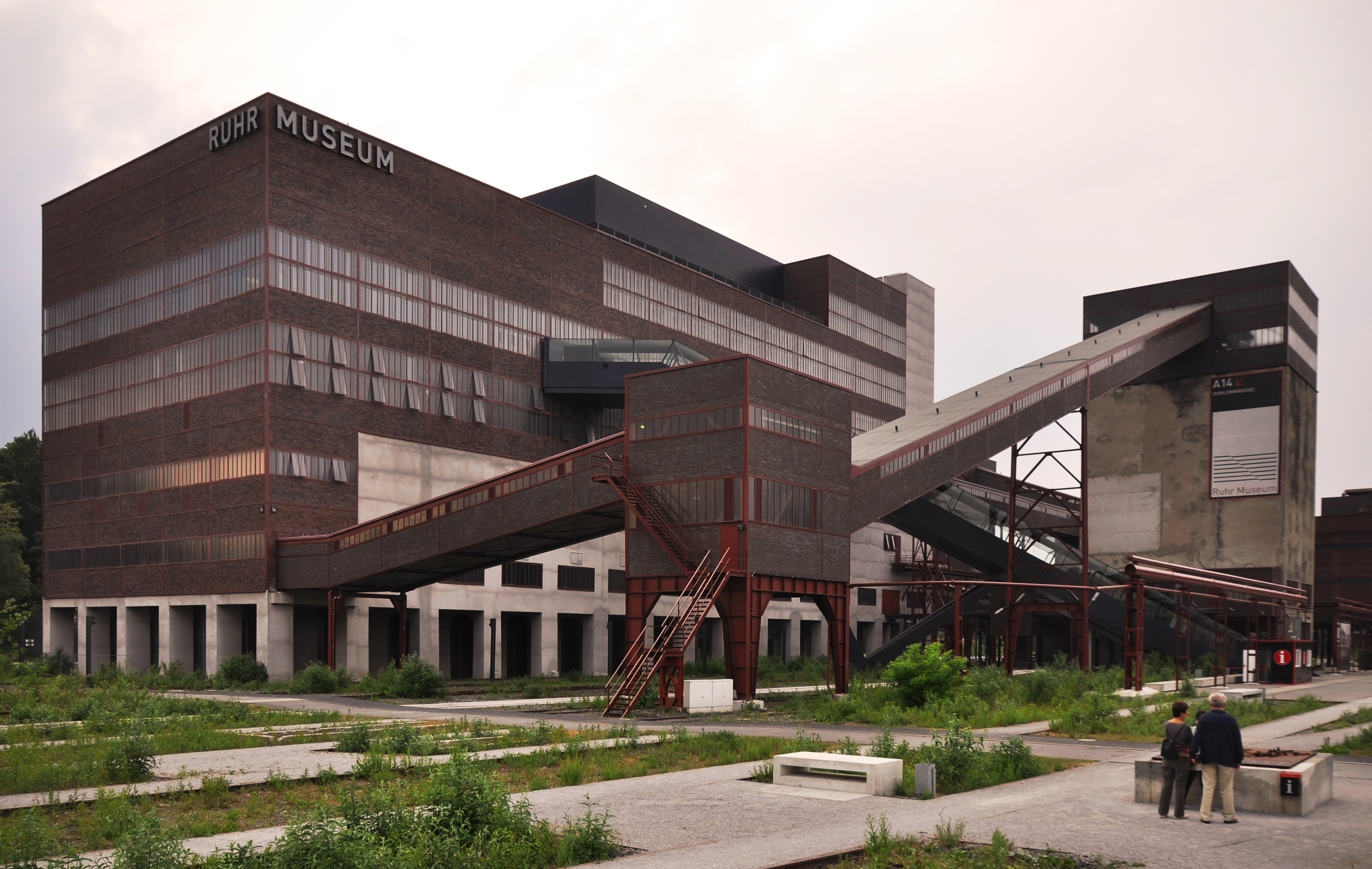
Former Kohlenwäsche (Coal Wash) in Essen, today Ruhr Museum, May 2011

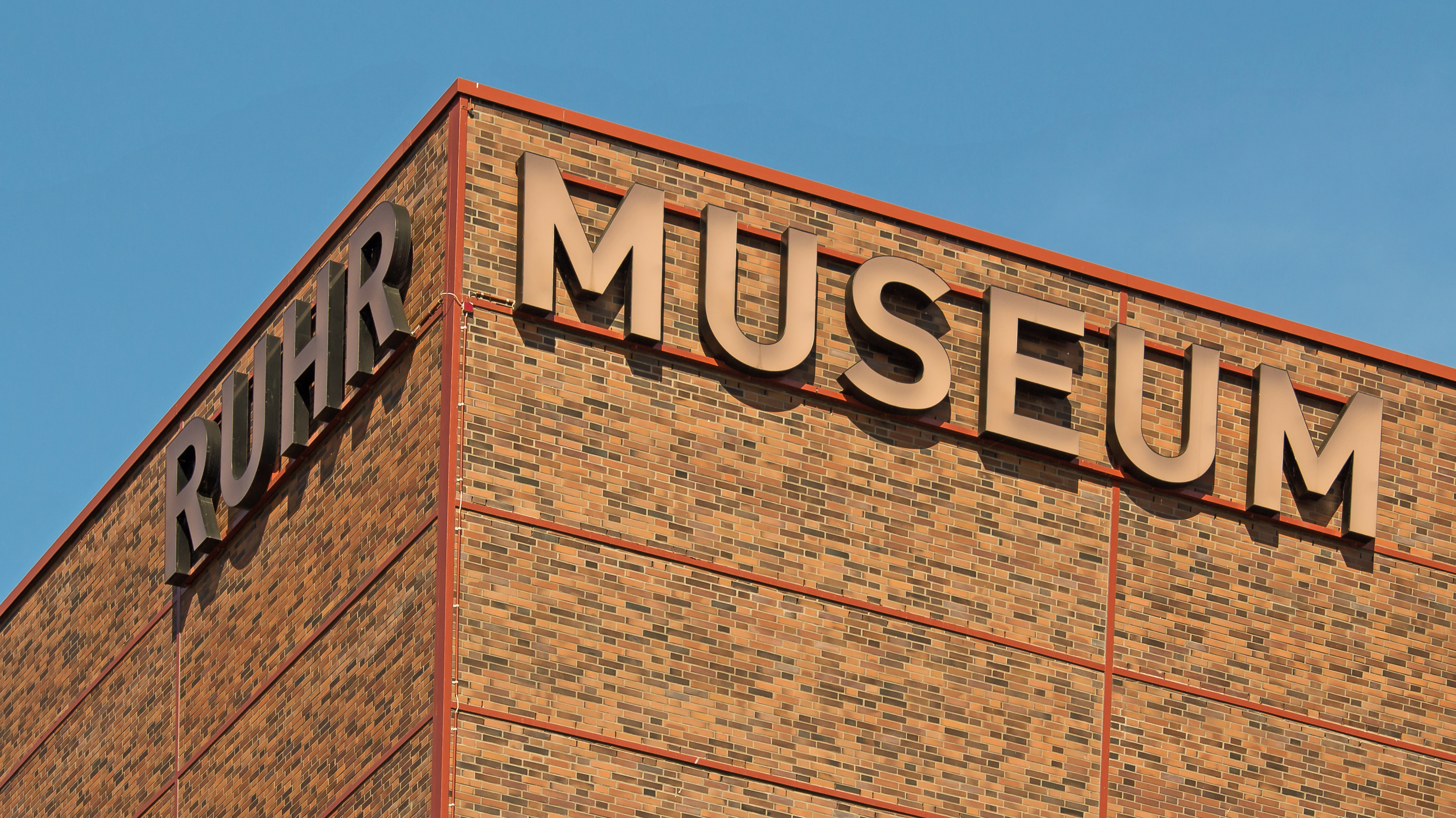
Logo of the Ruhr Museum, April 2016

The Ruhr Museum, formerly the Ruhrland Museum, is a diverse natural history and cultural history museum for the Ruhrgebiet in Essen, Germany. The sponsor is the Stiftung Ruhr Museum (Ruhr Museum Foundation). The director since 2012 is the historian Heinrich Theodor Grütter.

== Exhibitions ==
The museum, which understands itself as a memorial and showcase of the Ruhr area, documents nature, culture, and history of the Ruhr area in its permanent collection and thus the development of the largest agglomeration in Europe.

The new permanent exhibition in the Kohlenwäsche (Coal wash) of the Zeche Zollverein colliery (A 14, shaft XII) was designed by the Stuttgart office of HG Merz and is divided into four levels. On the 24-meter level, which is accessed by the large external escalator—the largest in Germany—there is a cash and information desk, a café, and the museum shop. On the 17 meter level, myths, phenomena, and structures of the present Ruhr area are presented. The 12-meter level represents the region's pre-industrial history and also includes the museum's collections on archeology, ethnology and natural history. On the 6 meter level, the history of the Ruhr area in the industrial age is represented. Thus the museum is not only an industry museum, but presents a triad of nature, culture and history.

On the 12-meter level there is an area for temporary exhibitions; likewise in the Gallery 21 in a mezzanine.

== History ==
The former Ruhrlandmuseum was closed in April 2007 to make way for the new buildings of the Museum Folkwang. The new Ruhr Museum opened its doors on 20 October 2008 in the coal mine of the World Cultural Heritage Zeche Zollverein, which was rebuilt to plans by Rem Koolhaas, with a presentation of the Essen Cathedral Treasury.

On 9 January 2010, the Ruhr Museum in the Zollverein World Heritage Site was ceremoniously opened in the presence of the Federal President Horst Köhler in the course of the Ruhrgebiet becoming a "Cultural Capital" during the Ruhr.2010 campaign.
