= Zeitlaich =

Painting by Jonas Burgert

Zeitlaich (lit. 'Time Spawn') is a 22 metres (72 ft) long and 6 metres (20 ft) high oil painting, made in Berlin by German artist Jonas Burgert. It depicts a large number of disparate figures in pink, red, blue and yellow colours. It was shown during the 2017 Gallery Weekend and received media attention for its size.

== Background ==
The German painter Jonas Burgert was born in Berlin in 1969, studied at the Berlin University of the Arts in 1991–1996 and had a breakthrough in 2005. He draws motif from areas such as science fiction, comics and ideas of the subconscious. He says he aims to portray the expression and atmosphere of his subjects, and he avoids horror and violence.

== Subject and composition ==
Zeitlaich shows a large number of humans, animals and objects, painted in pink, red, blue and yellow colours. Central in the picture is a three-metre-high bald and dark-skinned man wearing a three-piece suit and pink gloves. Among the disparate subjects are tigers, flamingos, a headless zebra, embryos, a naked woman at a piano, a car and a human skull. Many animals are hard to determine and have traits of both cats and dogs. Burgert describes the picture as a "concentration of irritation" and says he wanted it to have "this boundless excessive demand that we have".

Zeitlaich, oil on canvas, 6 m × 22 m (20 ft × 72 ft)

Burgert created Zeitlaich in his 800 m^{2} (960 sq yd) studio in an industrial part of Berlin's Weißensee area. He began to make the painting a year and a half before it was exhibited. The canvas is 22 metres (72 ft) long and 6 metres (20 ft) high and was the largest he had used. The picture is painted in oil using custom-made stepladders and metre-long extensions for the brush handles.

Burgert sketched the figures individually and says the greatest challenge was to create drama despite the lack of interaction between the subjects. A time-lapse video posted on the Internet shows how Zeitlaich evolved. The first discernible figure was a human silhouette above the ground near the middle; the figure remains in the finished painting but in a heavily reworked form. Burgert then began with the part in the middle to the left, where there is a skip from which animals seem to emerge.

== Reception ==
Zeitlaich was first shown at the gallery Blain Southern in Berlin from 29 April to 29 July 2017, as the title work of a Burgert solo exhibition. An aerial work platform had to be used to mount it at the gallery. The exhibition began during the Gallery Weekend and the painting received considerable media attention, especially for its monumental size.

In Kunstforum International, Ronald Berg said Zeitlaich makes Burgert unique in contemporary art due to its combination of figuration and giant size, and that its success has contributed to turning Burgert into an artistic authority. Julia Schmitz of Schirn Mag stressed the size and said it takes serious effort both physically and mentally to explore the painting, which gives Burgert the opportunity to depict more facets of life than ever before. Gabriele Walde of the Berliner Morgenpost likened the picture to Antonin Artaud's theories about absurd theatre: "things and figures whirl wildly in a disorderly manner, the perspectives tilt, everything is strangely skewed". She described it as a "motley Noah's Ark" that viewers can try to find their way through. Berg said Zeitlaich shows what the medium of painting can achieve and described it as a "daring attempt to depict human existence that transcends times, spaces and cultures". Schmitz said it reminds her of Hieronymus Bosch's works but it also has its own strengths, and compared it to a tableau vivant where Burgert explores his usual themes of human excess, loneliness, vanity and hatred. Andrea Bressa of Icon Magazine called it an extremely fascinating combination of landscape, drama, psychology and fantastical elements, and wrote that other, smaller paintings in the exhibition appeared to contemplate the main work.
