= HRH The Duke of Edinburgh (Ralph Heimans portrait) =

2017 painting by Ralph Heimans

- Artist: Ralph Heimans
- Year: 2017
- Type: Painting
- Medium: Oil on canvas
- Subject: Prince Philip, Duke of Edinburgh
- Dimensions: 160 cm × 230 cm (63 in × 91 in)
- Location: Royal Collection

HRH The Duke of Edinburgh, also known as HRH Prince Philip, is a 2017 portrait of Prince Philip, Duke of Edinburgh (1921–2021), consort to Queen Elizabeth II, by the Australian-British painter Ralph Heimans (b. 1970). It was exhibited at the Museum of Danish History at Frederiksborg Castle in Denmark to mark Philip's retirement from royal public service and celebrate his Danish heritage. It now is within the Royal Collection of the United Kingdom.

Philip is depicted in the Grand Corridor at Windsor Castle donning the sash of the Order of the Elephant, Denmark's highest-ranking honour. Included in the portrait is a painting which depicts Queen Victoria and the Danish royal family, including Philip's mother Princess Alice of Battenberg as a young girl. Also shown at the end of the Grand Corridor is the entrance to the bedroom where Alice and her mother Princess Victoria of Hesse and by Rhine were born.

The Duke of Edinburgh had been a Danish prince but agreed to relinquish his foreign royal titles upon marrying Princess Elizabeth of the United Kingdom (later Queen Elizabeth II) and his assumption of the title HRH and role as the monarch's consort. It was the final official portrait of him executed during his lifetime.

== See also ==
- The Coronation Theatre: Portrait of HM Queen Elizabeth II
- HRH The Prince of Wales (Ralph Heimans portrait)
