= Ralph Heimans =

Australian painter

Ralph Heimans AM
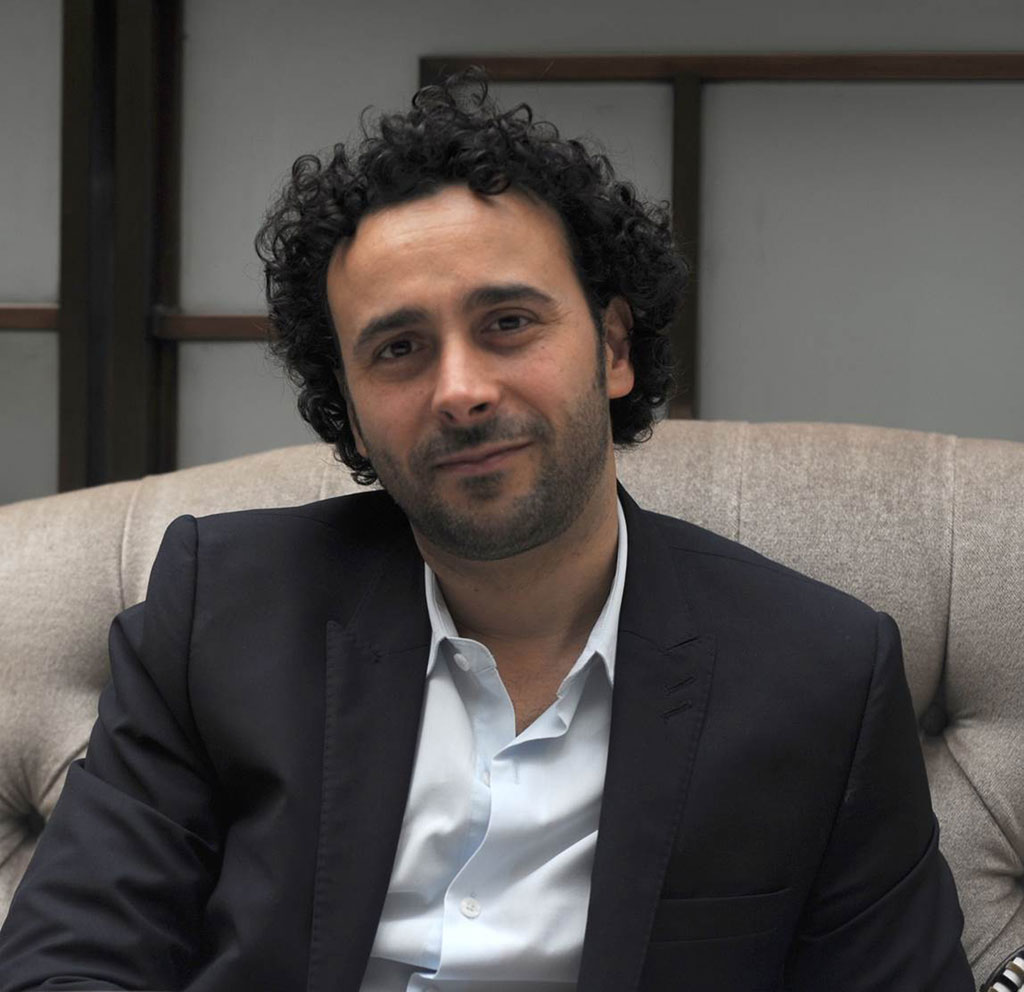
- Born: 1970 (age 55–56); Sydney, New South Wales, Australia
- Education: Mosman High School; University of Sydney; Julian Ashton Art School
- Known for: Painting
- Notable work: The Coronation Theatre: Portrait of HM Queen Elizabeth II; HRH The Duke of Edinburgh; HRH The Prince of Wales
- Spouse: Tami Bokey
- Website: www.ralphheimans.com

Ralph Jacob Heimans (born 1970) is an Australian-British contemporary portrait painter based in London, England. He is considered to be "one of today's leading portrait artists". He is best known for his large-scale Royal portraits of Queen Elizabeth II, Charles, Prince of Wales, and Prince Philip, Duke of Edinburgh, along with portraits of leading contemporary cultural figures. In the 2014 Birthday Honours, Heimans was appointed a Member of the Order of Australia for "significant service to the visual arts as a portrait painter."

== Biography ==
Heimans was born in Sydney in 1970, to a Dutch father who’s a documentary film maker and a Lebanese mother. His brother Jeremy Heimans, an author and activist, is the CEO of Purpose and co-founded GetUp and avaaz.org. His family is of Dutch and Lebanese Jewish descent.

Heimans attended Mosman High School and at 17 won the Australian National Art Award, (1987).

He studied architecture and then fine art and pure mathematics completing a BA at Sydney University in 1991. He continued to study drawing at the Julian Ashton Art School.

Heimans lived in South London with his wife, Tami Bokey and two daughters, Ellie Rose and Hannah, until they returned to live in Sydney after the COVID-19 pandemic.

== Royal portraits ==
Heimans was selected to paint the official Diamond Jubilee portrait of The Queen in 2012, The Coronation Theatre: Portrait of HM Queen Elizabeth II. It forms part of the Collection of Westminster Abbey and is on permanent display in the newly opened Triforium Gallery.

In 2017, Heimans produced a portrait of Prince Philip, Duke of Edinburgh to mark his retirement from public duties and highlight his family history and Danish roots. The portrait was acquired from the artist by the Royal Collection Trust in 2018.

In 2018, his portrait of the Prince of Wales was unveiled at Australia House in London to mark the Prince's 70th birthday. The work, set in Dumfries House in Scotland, focuses on the Prince's commitment to environmental protection and sustainability, architectural preservation and the notions of harmony between the natural world and the built environment. The portrait is part of the Royal Collection and will be on display in Dumfries House.

Heimans was commissioned by Frederiksborg Castle to paint Frederik, Crown Prince of Denmark, who unveiled his portrait in May 2018 to mark his 50th birthday. The portrait is a companion piece to Heimans’ 2006 critically acclaimed portrait of Mary, Crown Princess of Denmark. Her first official portrait, which was unveiled in Frederiksborg Castle in 2006 was praised for its multi-layered narrative and sophisticated treatment of the young princess..."a symphony of shadows."

== Portraits of cultural icons ==
Other notable works by Heimans include, culturally significant figures such as actors Dame Judi Dench and Sir Ben Kingsley. His portrait of pianist and conductor Vladimir Ashkenazy was produced in collaboration with the Sydney Symphony Orchestra and is now in the collection of the National Portrait Gallery of Australia. Well known Australian public figures include Michael Kirby (judge) (NPG Canberra) and Dame Quentin Bryce (Parliament House). His Shakespeare400 series of celebrated authors, including Margaret Atwood, Howard Jacobson, Anne Tyler, Gillian Flynn, Tracy Chevalier and Jo Nesbo was exhibited at Globe Theatre in 2016.

== Exhibitions and public collections ==
In May 2018, a major retrospective at Frederiksborg Castle, the Museum of National History, opened by Queen Margrethe II of Denmark, saw many of Heimans‘ most celebrated portraits displayed. The Director of the Museum, Mette Skougaard said the exhibition gave viewers "a rare opportunity to appreciate the range and depth of one of today's leading portrait artists". "Heimans's luminous work is built on a foundation of traditional techniques through a mastery of complex composition his subjects are woven into their surroundings to create a multi-layered narrative environment…building a landscape of the soul".

In 2016, Heimans painted a series of portraits of six authors who were reinterpreting Shakespeare's plays to celebrate the playwright's 400th birthday, Shakespeare400. Margaret Atwood, Anne Tyler, Tracy Chevalier, Gillian Flynn, Jo Nesbo and Howard Jacobson sat for him, and the paintings were exhibited at the Globe. Of his portrait, Jacobson said; "It's my soul. He's painted my soul". Author Anne Tyler said of Heimans's painting of her "I felt when I saw my finished portrait that I truly recognised myself, in a way that I have never recognised my photographs."

Heimans's works are held in major international collections around the world, including the Smithsonian Institution in Washington, the Royal Collection, the Danish Museum of National History Frederiksborg Castle, the National Portrait Gallery of Australia, Westminster Abbey, Australia's Parliament House and the European Court of Justice in Luxembourg.

Heimans's portrait of Queen Elizabeth II was exhibited in the Coronation Anniversary exhibition at the Chapter House in Westminster Abbey 2013, and at the National Portrait Gallery of Australia in 2012 as the centre piece of the exhibition "Glorious", which brought record numbers of visitors to the Gallery.

== Controversy ==
During the Coronation Exhibition at Westminster Abbey in 2013, Heimans's Diamond Jubilee portrait of the Queen was attacked. It was defaced by a campaigner, from Fathers4Justice, who spray-painted 'help!' across the portrait. As a premeditated act of vandalism of art it is one of many works of art which has been damaged while on public display. A court case ensued and the offender was jailed for a 6-month term. After 5 weeks of intensive work by the Conservation Department at Westminster Abbey it was restored. The portrait is now back on display in the Queen's Diamond Jubilee Gallery in the Triforium of Westminster Abbey.
