= Jonas Burgert =

German artist

- Born: 1969 (age 56–57); West Berlin, West Germany
- Known for: Painting

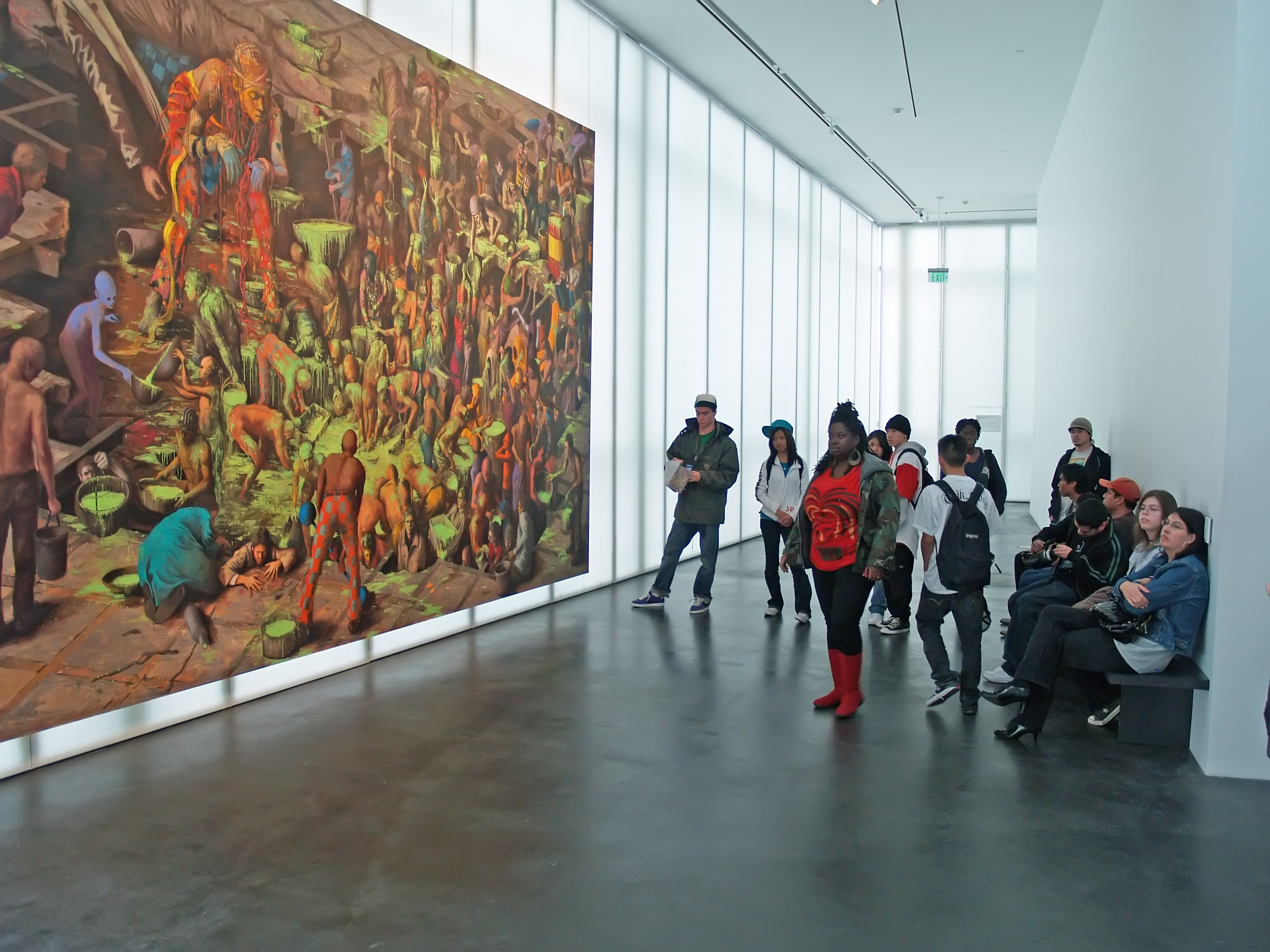
Viewers of Burgert's painting Second Day Nothing at the Denver Museum of Contemporary Art.

Jonas Burgert (German: [ˈbʊɐ̯gɐt]; born 1969, West Berlin) is a German artist based in Berlin.

He has shown work in many exhibitions including Rohkunstbau at Stipendiaten in Berlin, Geschichtenerzähler at Hamburg Kunsthalle and Dis-Positiv at Staatsbank in Berlin. Burgert has exhibited internationally at museums and galleries such as Galerie Sfeir-Semler , Beirut and Villa Manin, Passariano, Italy and was part of the Malerei Biennale in Stockholm in 2003. He is represented by Produzentengalerie in Hamburg BlainSouthern in London and Tang Contemporary Art in Hong Kong.

Burgert's 22 metres long painting Zeitlaich received considerable media attention when it was exhibited during the 2017 Gallery Weekend in Berlin.

== See also ==
- List of German painters
