= Héctor Zamora =

Mexican contemporary artist

Héctor Zamora (born 1974 in Mexico City) is a Mexican visual artist currently living and working in São Paulo, Brazil. In 2020, he was awarded the roof commission at the Metropolitan Museum of Art in New York City, for which he created Lattice Detour. Writing in the New York Times, art critic Holland Cotter said of the work: "it’s a monument to openness over enclosure, lightness over heaviness, transience over permanence. It’s also an image fraught with political meaning about what a wall — and specifically the planned U.S.-Mexico border wall hailed as “beautiful” by our current president — should be and do"...... For the 2021 Bruges Triennial, Zamora executed a giant red scaffolding structure around an Austrian Pine tree in the centre of the walled garden of Gezellehuis.

== Biography ==
Zamora works in installation, performance, and sculpture. He received his B.A. in Graphic Design from the Universidad Autónoma Metropolitana Xochimilco (UAM-X) Campus in Mexico in 1998, and completed postgraduate coursework in structural geometry at the UNAM in Mexico City. Zamora has been exhibiting his artwork since 2000, and has produced a significant body of work in public spaces. Zamora currently lives in So Paulo, Brazil. The artist works around the world in public spaces, often using common construction materials. He strives to challenge the way people perceive urban or architectural areas as well as bring light to social change by using materials that resonate within that place to create constructions that connect with traits or social patterns of that space and surroundings. By redefining the traditional exhibition context, Zamora's work creates conflict between the traditional roles of public and private spaces. In some of his creations, Zamora compels viewers to question social institutional structures.

== Notable artworks ==
Lattice Detour (2020), Metropolitan Museum of Art, New York City

The Lattice Detour was a site-specific work for the Met’s roof garden in New York. The piece shifts the perspective of the roof garden terrace and the manhattan landscape by creating a lattice wall from one of our oldest materials: the brick. Zamora used a curving wall made of bricks that had holes in them, through which one could peer. This perspective shift is common in Zamoras artwork, through its simultaneous presentation of openness and physical obstruction. It created a web of shadows that interacted with the landscape as light and air passed through it. The bricks were stacked on their side, standing 11 feet high.

Labor (2019), Movimientos emisores de existencia, Mexico City,

As with much of Zamora's work, the material involved has a deeper meaning and connections with the true purpose behind his work. In the 2019 work entitled Labor, he used unfired clay sculptures that were vases, a type of pottery historically used by different cultures to store necessities. In this work, there were 650 empty soft vases on the ground. Zamora lined up a group of seven women wearing black tunics and had them step on the vessels as part of a performance on the first day. The artist claimed the vases reflected that the feminine figure carrying water on their heads was the inspiration behind the piece. The artwork served as a protest: the performance of walking on these clay works expressed a symbolism of women breaking the patriarchy, reshaping the perspective of the female purpose, and opening the public eye to the freedom or lack that they're of many women.

Memorándum (2017), Museo Universitario del Chopo, Mexico City

The title, Memorándum, itself alludes to institutional circulars and has the Latin meaning "something that must be remembered." This art piece uses memory as a tool to make personal dignity visible and to bear witness to the bravery and poise of women who have worked for the profit of men and gone unnoticed. Zamora's work gives visibility to the otherwise invisible work of thousands of women who have dedicated years of their lives to a dehumanizing line of work. Zamora brings light to the topic of gendered work by using standing scaffolding around the museum's walls where 48 similarly dressed women typists sat at workstations and typed up their own biografical history on vintage typewriters. Papers flew through the air of the museum. Typewriter ribbons had run out of ink as the women continued to type their invisible history. Zamora created the work as a statement against the hidden nature of labor. Steel criss-cross beams were supporting small wooden individual workspaces, and multiple desks were spread out on each of the five floors of scaffolding. Each desk had a vintage typewriter. During the performance, you could hear the echoing of hammer keys clanging and the ring of the typewriters in a chaotic rhythm. Each desk had a vintage typewriter. thought the performance you should hear the echoing of hammer keys clanging and the ring of the typewriters in a chaotic rhythm.

Brasil (2013), Art Basel, Miami Beach

Zamora stacked clay bricks on top of metal bikes. He stacked the bricks in a disorganized fashion like a balancing act on the movable object as a way to reference the country of Brasil's unstable foundation.

== Selected exhibitions ==
=== Solo exhibitions ===
- 2013. 10ª Bienal Internacional de Arquitetura de São Paulo, Brazil2013. Istanbul Biennial, Istanbul, Turkey.
- 2012. Muegano, Commissioned by SCAPE Public Art, Christchurch, New Zealand.
- 2012. Architecture + Art, SMoCA, Scottsdale, Arizona, US.
- 2011. Zeppelin Schärme, Zeppelin Museum, Friedrichshafen, Germany.
- 2011. White Noise, Bethells beach – Shed 6 – Elam project-space B431, Auckland Festival, Auckland, New Zealand
- 2010. Errant, Margem project, Tamanduateí river, Itau Cultural, Sao Paulo, Brazil
- 2010. Credibility Crisis, Project room, Miami Basel, Miami, USA.
- 2008. De Belg wordt geboren met een baksteen in de maag, FLACC, Genk, Belgium.
- 2007. Specular Reflections, Cerca Series, MCASD, San Diego, CA, US.
- 2005. Unidad habitacional. La Casa Encendida, Madrid, Spain.
- 2004. Paracaidista, Av. Revolución 1608 bis. Carrillo Gil Museum, Mexico City, Mexico.

=== Group exhibitions ===
- 2013. Blind Field, Guggenheim Foundation. Mumbai, India
- 2012. En Suspensión, Espai d’Art Contemporari de Castello, Castello, Spain
- 2012. Resisting the Present, Musée d'Art Moderne de la Ville de Paris/ARC, France.
- 2012. About Change, The World Bank Group, Washington DC, USA.
- 2011. Disponible, School of the Museum of Fine Arts, Boston, USA.
- 2011. FGAP@Venice, Official Collateral Event, 54th Venice Biennale, Venice, Italy.
- 2011. Wasser,Schiene, Straße, Luft, Zeppelin Museum, Friedrichshafen, Germany.
- 2010. The diversity of all and everything possible, 12th International Cairo Biennale, Cairo, Egypt
- 2010. Disponible, Walter and McBean Galleries, San Francisco Art Institute, San Francisco, CA, USA.
- 2010. Touched, Liverpool Biennial, Liverpool, UK.
- 2009. Making Worlds, 53ª International Exhibition Biennale di Venezia, Venice, Italy.
- 2008. Quase Líquido, Itaú Cultural, Sao Paulo, Brazil.
- 2007. Viva Mexico, Zacheta National Gallery of Art, Warsaw, Poland.
- 2006. Busan Biennale 2006; Pusan, South Korea.
- 2006. Novena Bienal de la Habana, Ciudad de la Habana, Cuba.
- 2005. Farsites / sitios distantes, San Diego Museum of Art, Insite05, San Diego CA, USA.
- 2003. Fission/fusion, Mexican Cultural Institute, Washington DC, US.
- 2001. Con Fulgente Hado, outdoor program by X – Teresa Museum, Mexico City, Mexico.

== Collections ==
His work is held in international museums including the Zeppelin Museum Collection in Friedrichshafen, Germany; Chartwell Collection, Auckland, New Zealand; Jumex Collection Foundation, Mexico City; AXA Collection, Mexico City; and the Metropolitan Museum of Art in New York City.

== Grants and awards ==
- 2014 Premio Arco Comunidad de Madrid para Jovenes Artistas, Madrid, Spain.
- 2011 Graham Foundation, Architecture + Art: Héctor Zamora Solo Exhibition fall 2012, SMoCA, Scottsdale, AZ.
- 2010 Programa Brasil Arte Contemporânea, Sao Paulo Biennial Foundation, International Exhibition award, Sao Paulo, Brazil. 2009 Gran Centenario Emerging Artist Award, Cuervo Foundation, FEMACO, Mexico City, Mexico.
- The Garage Center for Contemporary Culture (GCCC Moscow) sponsorship for the 53rd Venice Biennial project. 2007 The Pollock-Krasner Foundation, Inc.
- 2006 CIFO Cisneros Fontanals Art Foundation. Jumex Collection Foundation.
- 2003 BBVA Bancomer Foundation.

== Publications ==
- Inconstância Material – Hector Zamora, Luciana Brito, 2012
- Paracaidista, av. Revolucion 1608 bis / intervención de Hector Zamora, 2007
