= Pettit Marine Paint =

Boat coating manufacturer

Pettit Marine Paint is a manufacturer of marine (boat) coatings, antifouling boat bottom paint, varnish and epoxies for consumer and commercial markets. The company was established in 1861, its headquarters are located in Rockaway, New Jersey.

== History ==
In 1861, the Gardiner McInnes Company in Salem, Massachusetts was developing the “Old Salem” anti-fouling paint line. This product was manufactured as a plastic lump that had to be heated, melted and mixed. “Old Salem” was used primarily by the United States Navy, but the demand eventually diminished and the McInnes Company switched gears, developing an architectural line of “Old Salem” paints. During World War II they would revert to the marine industry, developing McInnes Green, an antifouling paint that was used in large quantities on US Government contracts.

During these years for the Gardiner McInnes Company, another paint company was emerging onto the scene. A chemist John L Pettit decided to branch away from the company and begin his own line of paints. In 1923 John L Pettit established the Pettit Paint Company, based in Jersey City, New Jersey.

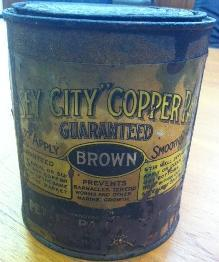
Pettit "Jersey City" Copper Paint 1923

Not long after establishing their company, the Pettit Paint Company purchased the McInnes Company along with their established brands, including the “Old Salem” line. This purchase would expand the products Pettit offered as well as their customer base. As the Pettit Paint Company gained popularity, they relocated to a larger, more accommodating plant in Belleville, New Jersey. After four expansions, the Pettit Paint Company and their offices were moved to Rockaway, New Jersey in 1972.

In California the Z-Spar line was coming to life. Andrew Brown had been involved in a joint venture with his brother, specializing in automotive and home paint. With operations out of both California and Argentina, the pair discovered that working as a joint union was too difficult. After breaking away from the business with his brother, Brown was ready to tackle a new market on his own. In 1948, Brown introduced a line of marine paint known as Z-Spar. After a successful run with the product, Z-Spar was sold to a company called Koppers. Shortly after Z-Spar joined Koppers, they would purchase the Woolsey line, merging the two companies under one name. Pettit Marine Paint was established in 1972, after the unification of three lines of marine paint manufactures – Pettit, Woolsey, and Z-Spar.

Throughout the years, the Pettit line would continue to grow in the pleasure boat market. From the early 1980s through 1990 the companies were bought and sold various times until the three lines were all under the ownership of Koppers. The products were expanded and improved. Today, the Pettit lines, along with the Woolsey and Z-Spar have been combined under the name, Pettit Marine Paint and continue to operate out of the Rockaway, New Jersey plant.

== Paint Types and Technologies ==
Hard Modified Epoxies - The active ingredient leaches out while the paint film stays mostly intact. Leaching Coppers lose performance as time goes by and must be repainted after dry storage. Traditional Leaching Paints do not require movement and work equally well at the dock and underway. These products should be sanded well prior to re-coating to prevent build-up.

Ablatives - (Ultima and Hydrocoat Technology) Ablative polymers paints wear away with use exposing new biocides, both the biocides and the paint film disappear over time. Ablative Polymers can be used multi‐season and maintain a more steady performance throughout their useful life. Ablative Polymers require movement of the boat in order to work. Works similar to a bar of soap. Polishes and wears away with use.

Hybrid - (Vivid Technology) Hybrid antifoulings offering a hard paint that does not build up. Hybrid's work by leaching out the biocides just as a Traditional Leaching Copper does, but once the biocides are gone, the paint film will break down exposing a new layer of biocide. Hybrid paint films resist build ‐up but can be burnished, trailered, dry-stored, and taken in and out of the water without loss of protection.

Copper Free - Econea is a non-metal biocide which is extremely effective against hard-shelled fouling organisms including barnacles, hydroids, mussels, oysters and tube worms. Econea should always be combined with a secondary biocide to prevent soft growth and enhance its antifouling capabilities.

White Copper -(Cuprous Thiocyanate)- requires 50% less copper content than the heavy, dark copper used in conventional antifouling paints. They are the only copper-based paints that are compatible with aluminum.

Low Density Copper - replaces the core of traditional Cuprous Oxide with environmentally friendly materials found naturally in the ocean. The result is a copper biocide that provides the performance of a conventional cuprous oxide antifoulant while reducing the amount of copper introduced into the environment.

Irgarol - is used in many dual biocide products, Irgarol is an algicide designed for use in antifouling paints to prevent soft growth such as algae and grasses.

Water Based (Hydrocoat Technology)- This formula uses water to replace the harsh solvents found in conventional antifouling paints. The product has an extremely low VOC content. The unique low‐odor formula allows unlimited dry time to launch, and allows painting indoors.

Clean Core Technology - An enhanced paint film that contains fewer heavy metals, and allows a more consistent release of biocides. By removing the heavy metals in the paint film, and replacing them with more environmentally friendly additives, Clean Core Technology can reduce the amount of heavy metals released into our waters by up to 90%. These new additives have been specially formulated to provide a more “finetuned” and consistent release of the biocides from the paint film. This results in a more effective bottom paint that requires lower biocide levels to deliver full antifouling protection.
