= Heinrich Koppers =

German engineer

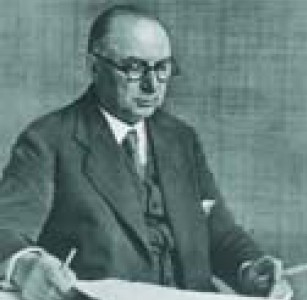

Heinrich Koppers (November 23, 1872 – September 5, 1941) was a German engineer. Koppers developed a new type of coke oven that economically recovered the byproduct chemicals of the coking process. The design of these ovens was superior to other ovens.

== Biography ==
Having previously worked at other German companies, Koppers founded his own company, Heinrich Koppers AG, in 1901 to successfully exploit the patents he had been granted in the area of coke oven design. The headquarters of Heinrich Koppers AG were located in Essen - Moltkeviertel, adjacent to the mansion of the Koppers family. (Both buildings were built in 1911.).

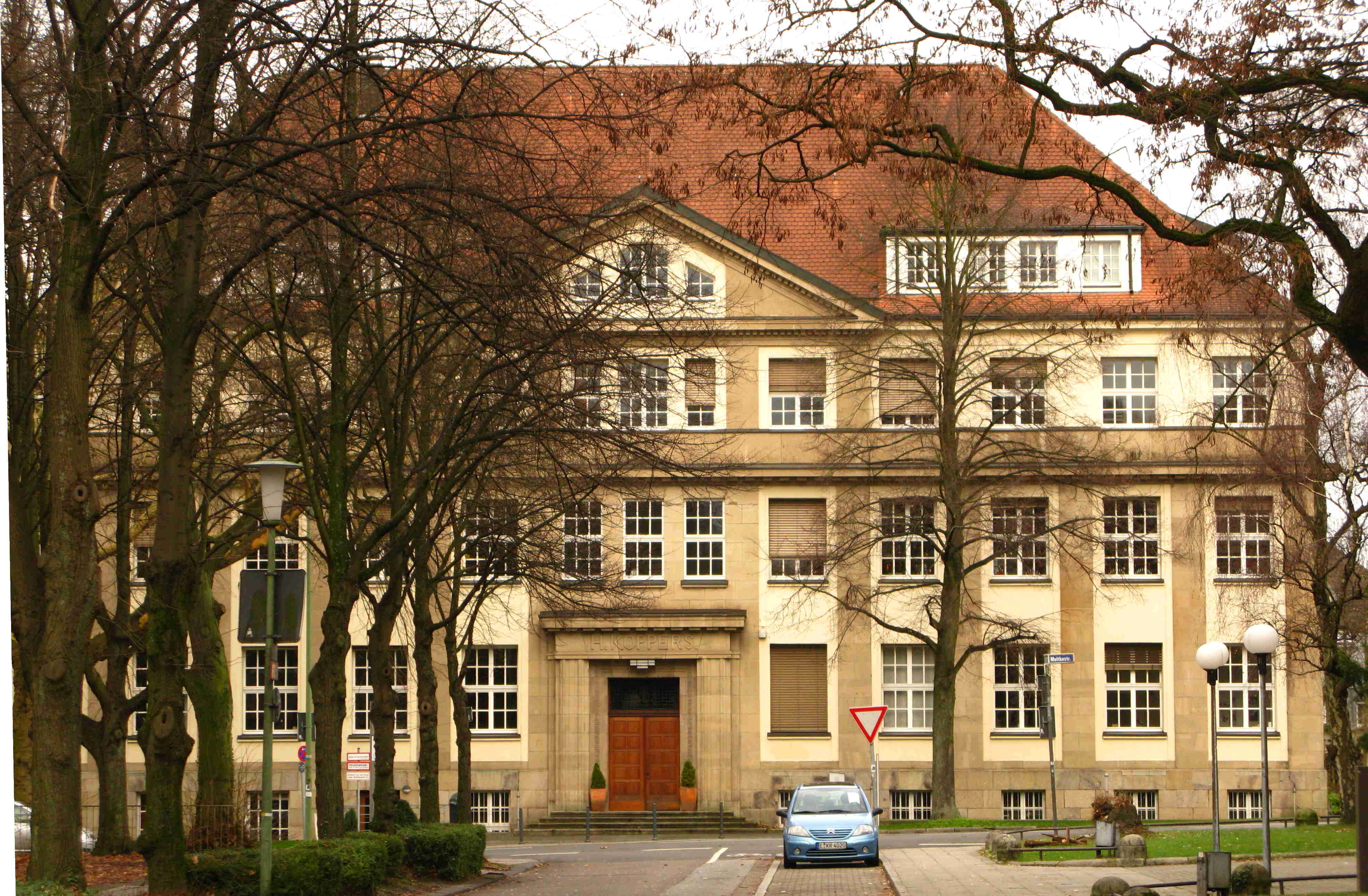
former headquarters, Heinrich Koppers AG; enlarge image to read inscription above front door

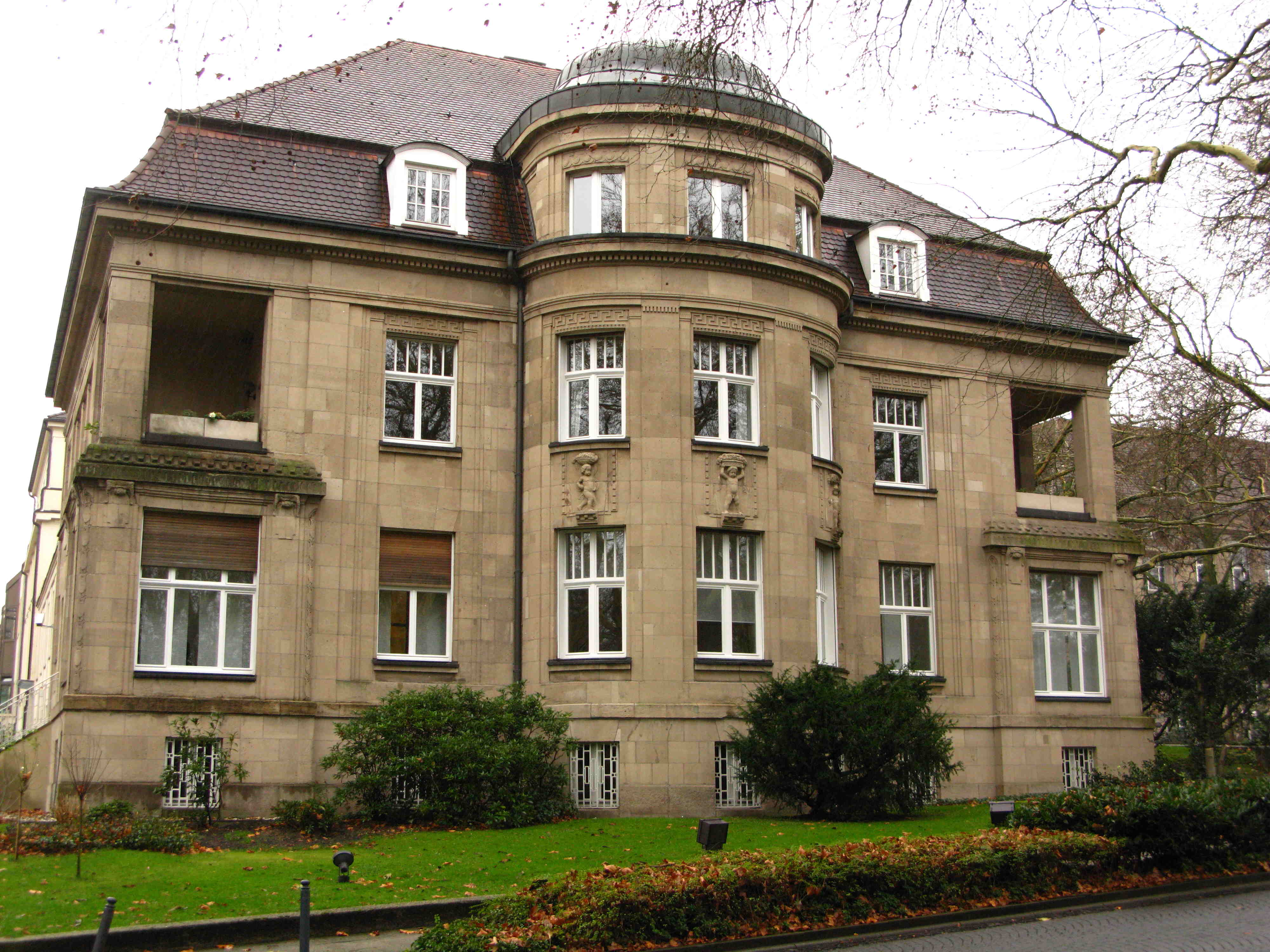
Villa Koppers: former residence of the Heinrich Koppers family

After meeting with US Steel in 1907, Koppers agreed to build a coke plant in the United States and formed the H. Koppers Company. In 1912, the H. Koppers Company was incorporated to be Koppers Inc. in Chicago, Illinois, an industrial organization which moved to Pittsburgh, Pennsylvania, United States in 1914.

In 1914, Koppers sold his controlling stake in Koppers Inc. to industrialist Andrew Mellon for $300,000.

== See also ==
- Koppers
