= Moltkeviertel =

Coordinates: 51°26′35.3″N 07°01′33.7″E

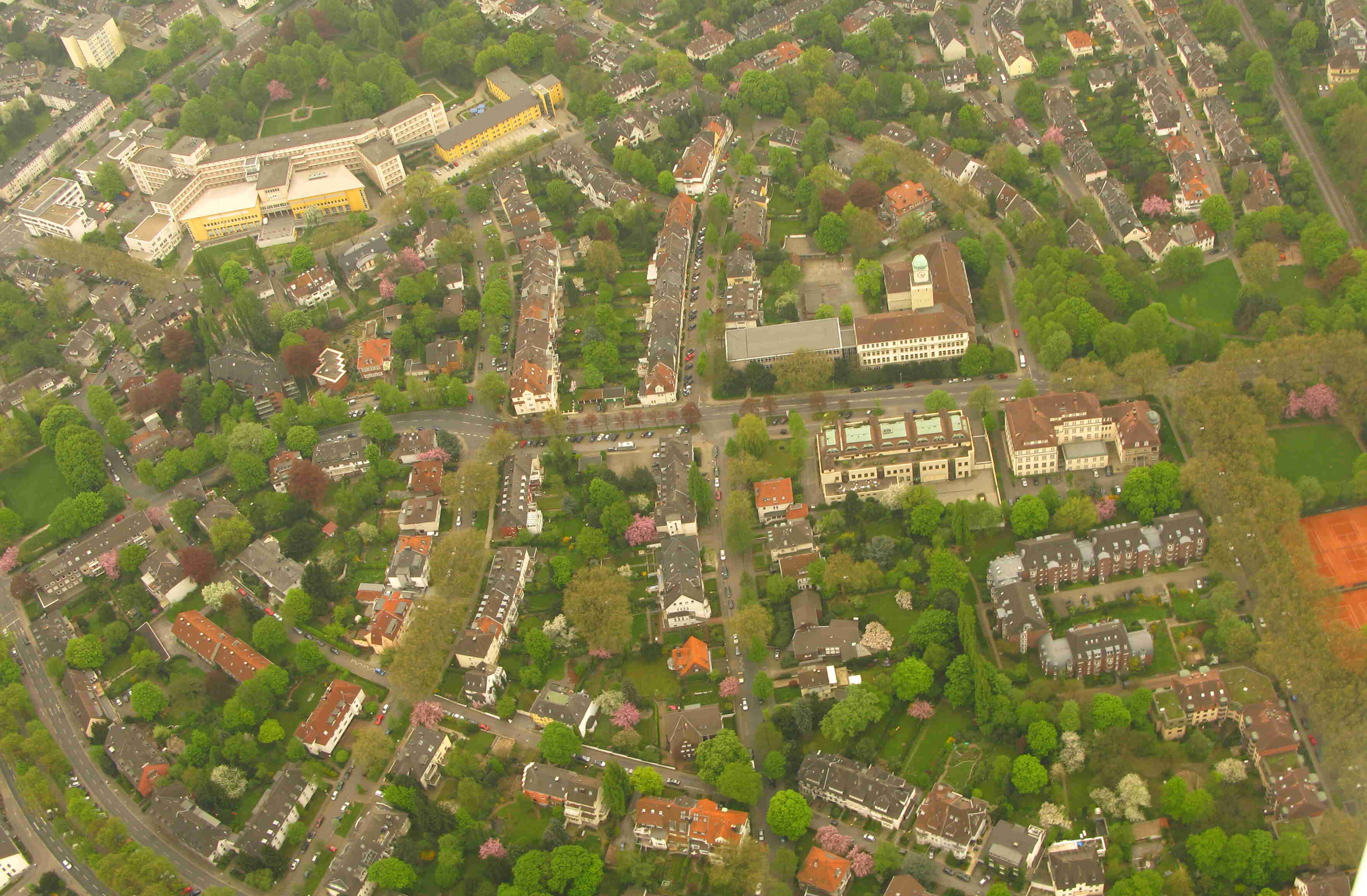
View over the Moltkeviertel from the north (2009)

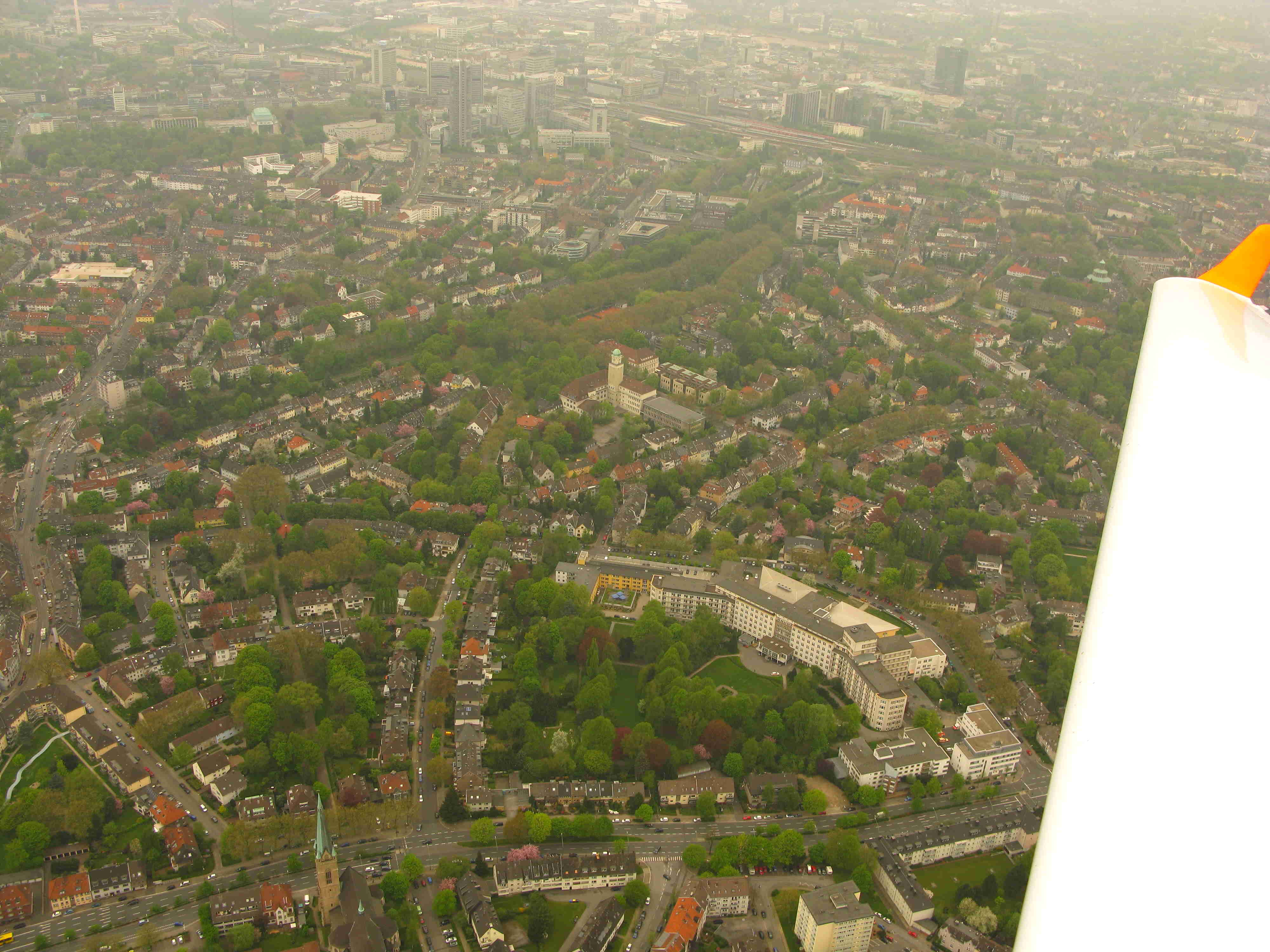
View over the Moltkeviertel from the south-east (2009)

The Moltkeviertel (Moltke Quarter) is a district of the German city of Essen. It is located near the centre of the town, as the crow flies just over a kilometre to the south-east of the Essen main railway station. It is bounded by the thoroughfares Kronprinzenstrasse, Ruhrallee, Töpferstrasse and Rellinghauserstasse and by the railway line from Essen Main Station to Essen-Werden (S6 rapid transit link to Düsseldorf and Cologne). Administratively, it belongs to the urban districts of Essen-Südostviertel and Essen-Huttrop. The centre point of the Moltkeviertel is the Robert-Schmidt-Berufskolleg (vocational college), formerly the Königliche Baugewerkschule (Royal Building College) Essen, at the corner of Moltkestrasse and Robert-Schmidt-Strasse.

== Town planning ==
In terms of town planning, the Moltkeviertel was conceived at the beginning of the 20th century as a single unit. As a response to the lack of high-quality residential housing in the up-and-coming and prosperous city of Essen, it was planned by the visionary town planner and city councillor Professor Robert Schmidt following principles which are partly still relevant today and were at that time revolutionary. This included, among other things, the creation of broad urban ventilation lanes in the form of wide streets and cohesive green zones. The notions behind these extended parks in the immediate vicinity of the houses, sometimes with large playing and sporting areas – the tennis courts were planned as early as 1908 – were essentially reformative in character and these facilities are still very much in use today. The naming of the quarter's streets after great master builders such as Karl Friedrich Schinkel, Gottfried Semper, Joseph Maria Olbrich and others testifies to the great esteem in which architecture was held. On the other hand, the idea of giving the quarter's largest street and largest square the name of the Prussian field marshal Helmuth Karl Bernhard Graf von Moltke is more a reflection of the prevailing zeitgeist between the turn of the century and the First World War.

== Reform architecture ==
From 1908 on, the roughly half a square kilometre site purchased by the city was developed: splendid mansions were constructed, as were semi-detached and terraced houses and company head offices, built according to individual plans and to suit the respective owner's finances – in the style of Reform Architecture (German: Reformarchitektur) throughout. With a clock tower towering above everything, the Königliche Baugewerkschule (Royal Building College) Essen, the centrepiece of the quarter, was constructed between 1908 and 1911. The Staatliche Ingenieurschule für Bauwesen (State Civil Engineering College) later occupied the building, and this was succeeded by the Kaufmännische Schule III der Stadt Essen (Commercial College III of the City of Essen) on 30 August 1982. This was renamed to Robert-Schmidt-Berufskolleg (Robert Schmidt Vocational College) in August 2000. Georg Metzendorf, Edmund Körner and other prominent architects created in the immediate vicinity architecture for the prosperous middle classes, architecture which at that time provided residences of a high, sometimes the highest standard – especially in the form of prestigious mansions. Even after a hundred years, they constitute a desirable residential quarter. At Moltkeplatz, Otto Bartning built his first church in Germany (consecrated in 1910) for the Old Lutheran parish (now SELK – Independent Lutheran Church). Subsequently, he designed the nearby Church of the Resurrection (Auferstehungskirche), built in 1929, which is one of the most important models for modern church construction in central Europe. At the corner of Moltkestrasse and Camillo-Sitte-Platz, the building housing the residence and studio (subsequently only the studio) of Edmund Körner was constructed in 1928/29, exhibiting both elements of the Neues Bauen movement and industrial structures, such as at the mine site Zeche Zollverein. Many of the old buildings and the Moltke Bridge are listed monuments. A major portion of the quarter has been subject to a preservation statute since 1983, something to which the quarter's "traditionally self-confident residents" are highly committed.

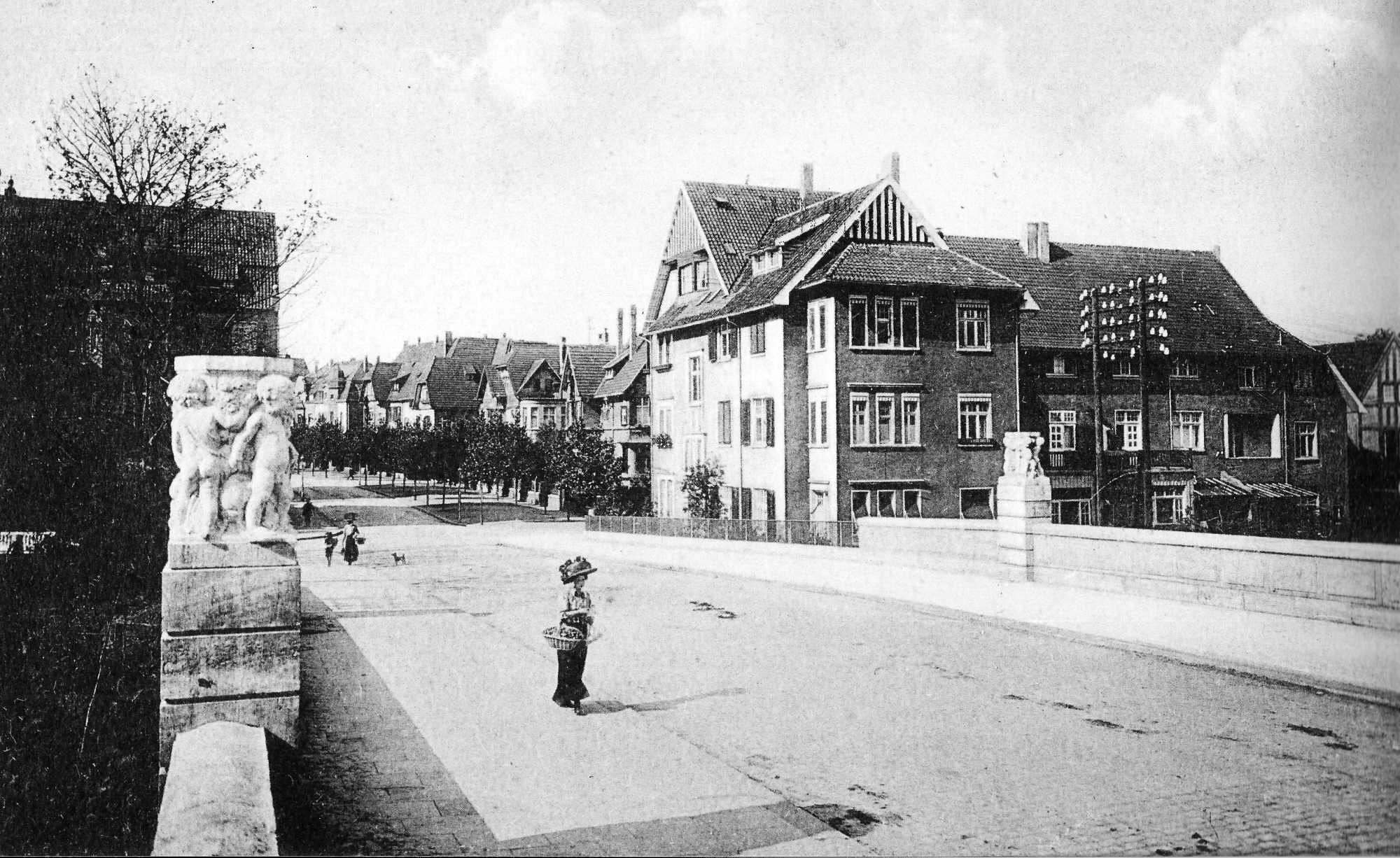
Moltke Bridge; picture taken in 1910

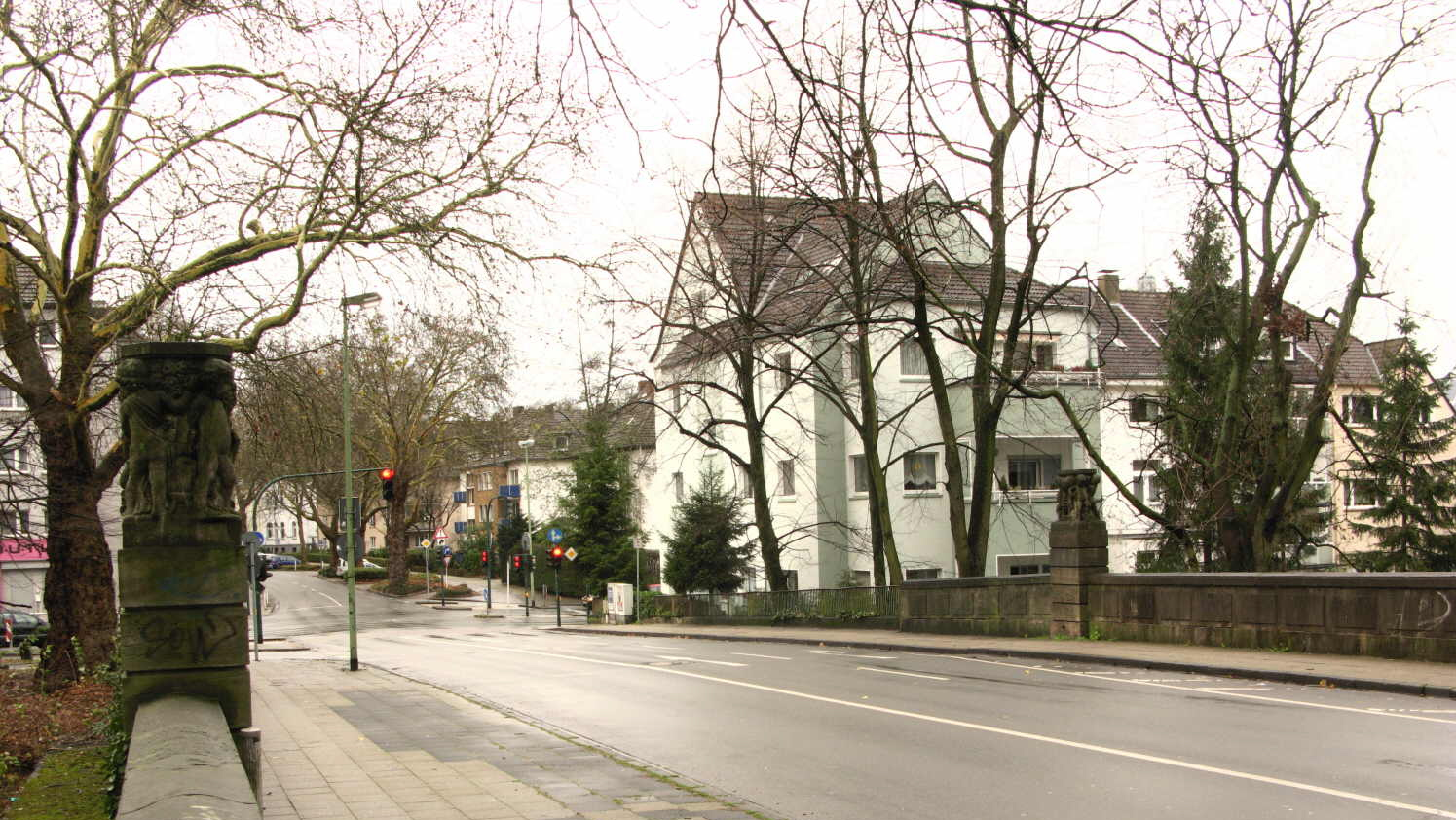
Moltke Bridge; today

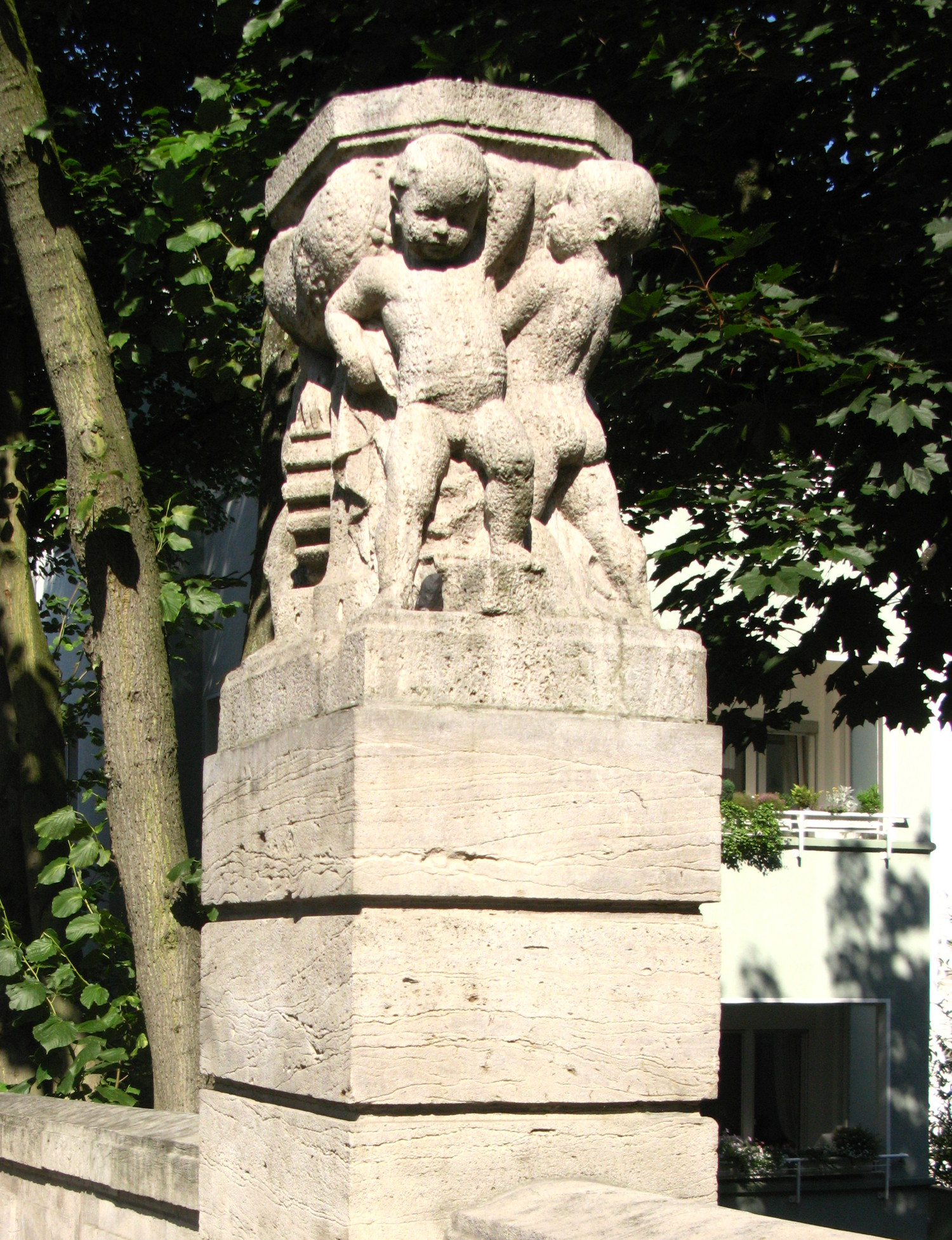
Sculptures on the Moltke Bridge over the S-Bahn rapid transit line

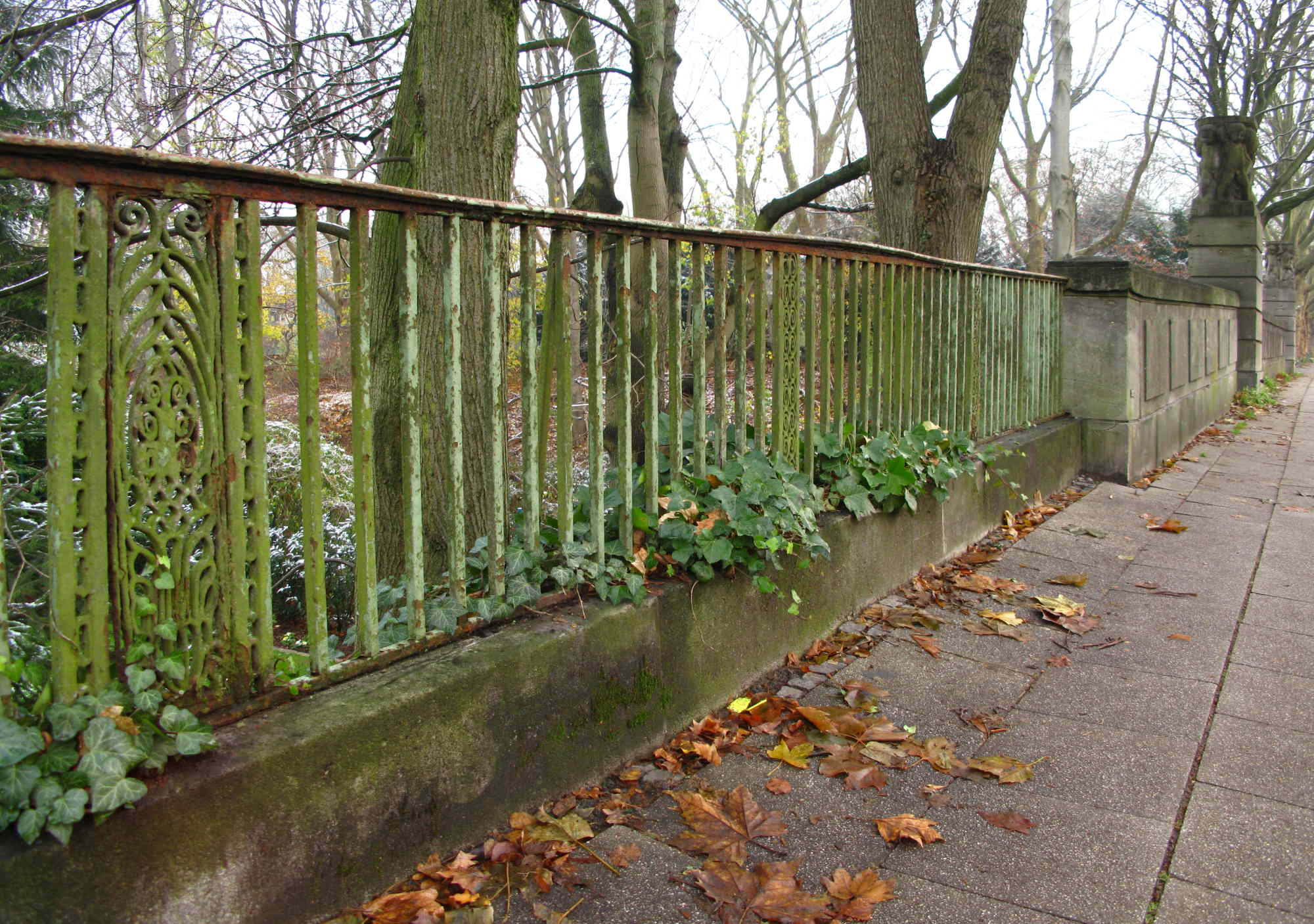
Art nouveau railings next to the Moltke Bridge

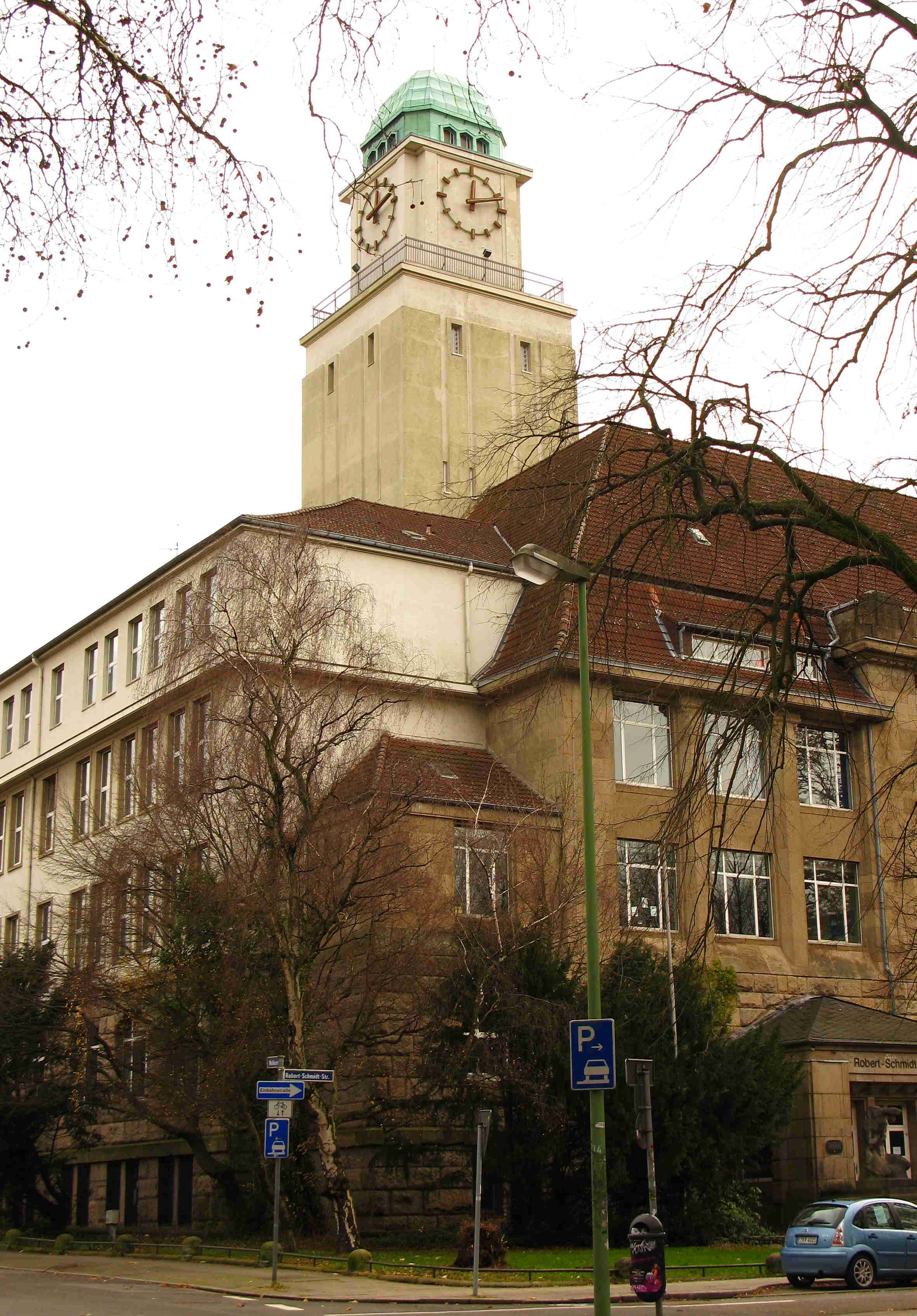
Robert Schmidt Vocational College (formerly the Royal Building College)

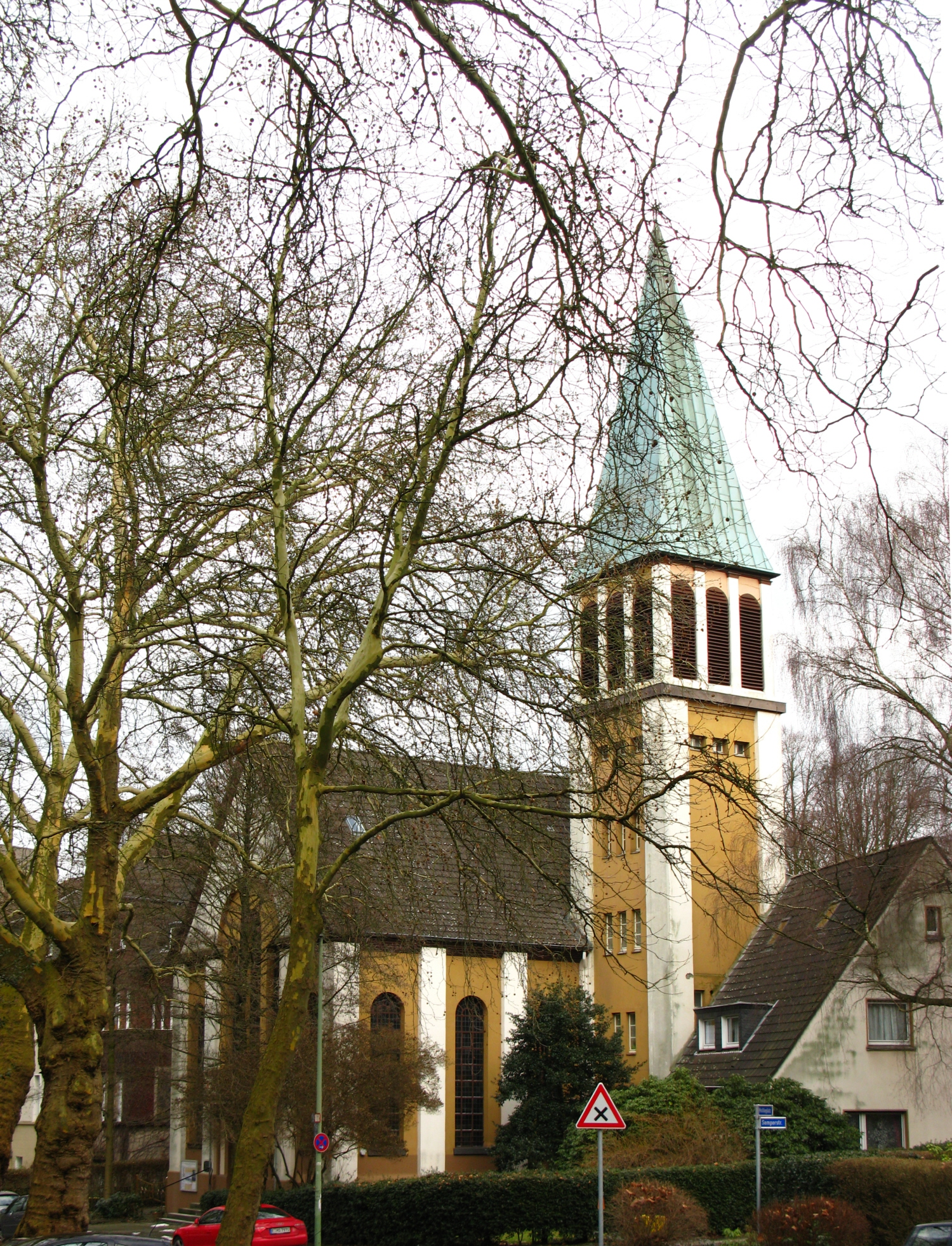
Independent Lutheran Church SELK at Moltkeplatz

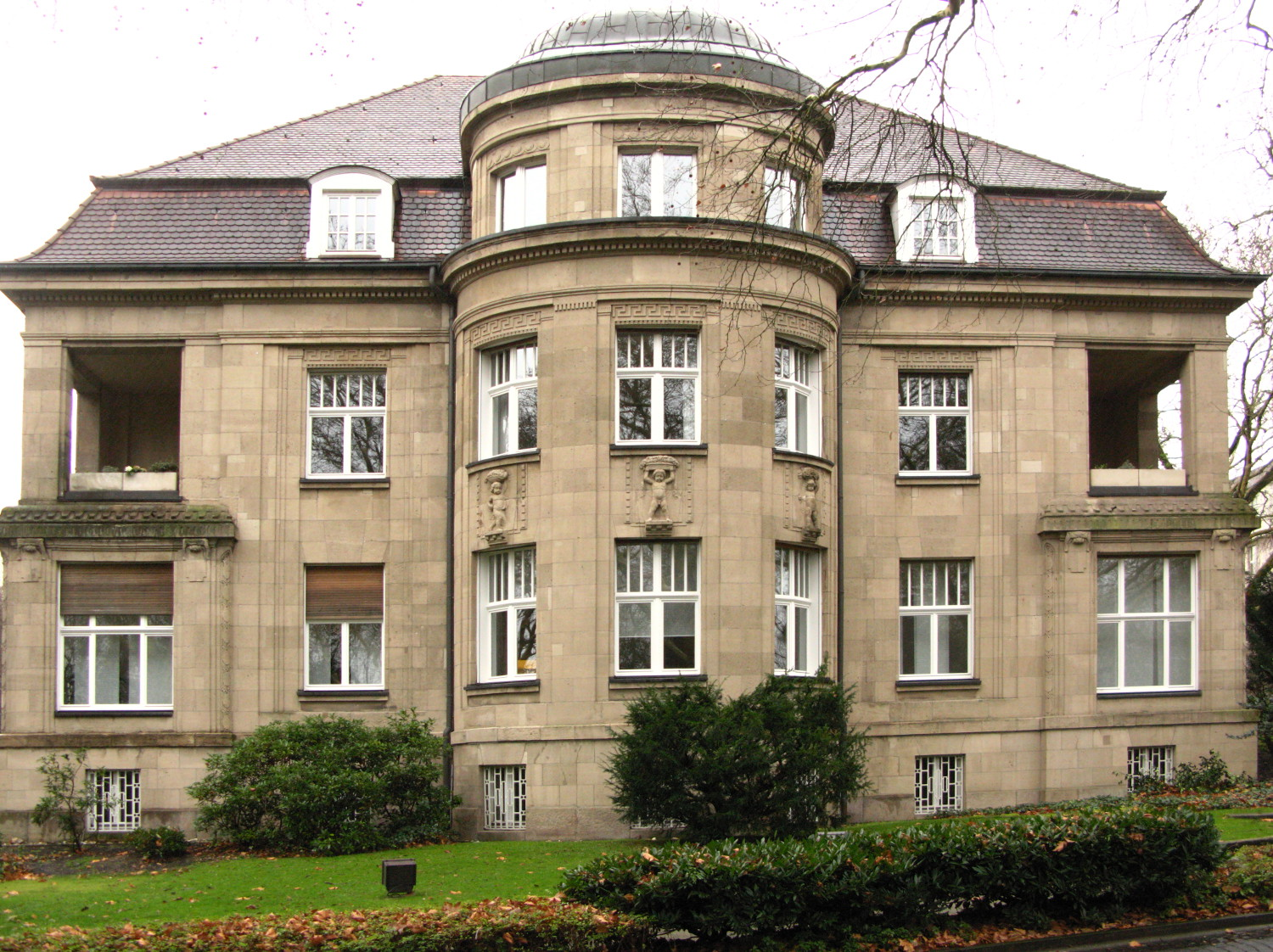
Moltkeplatz; former residence of the Heinrich Koppers family

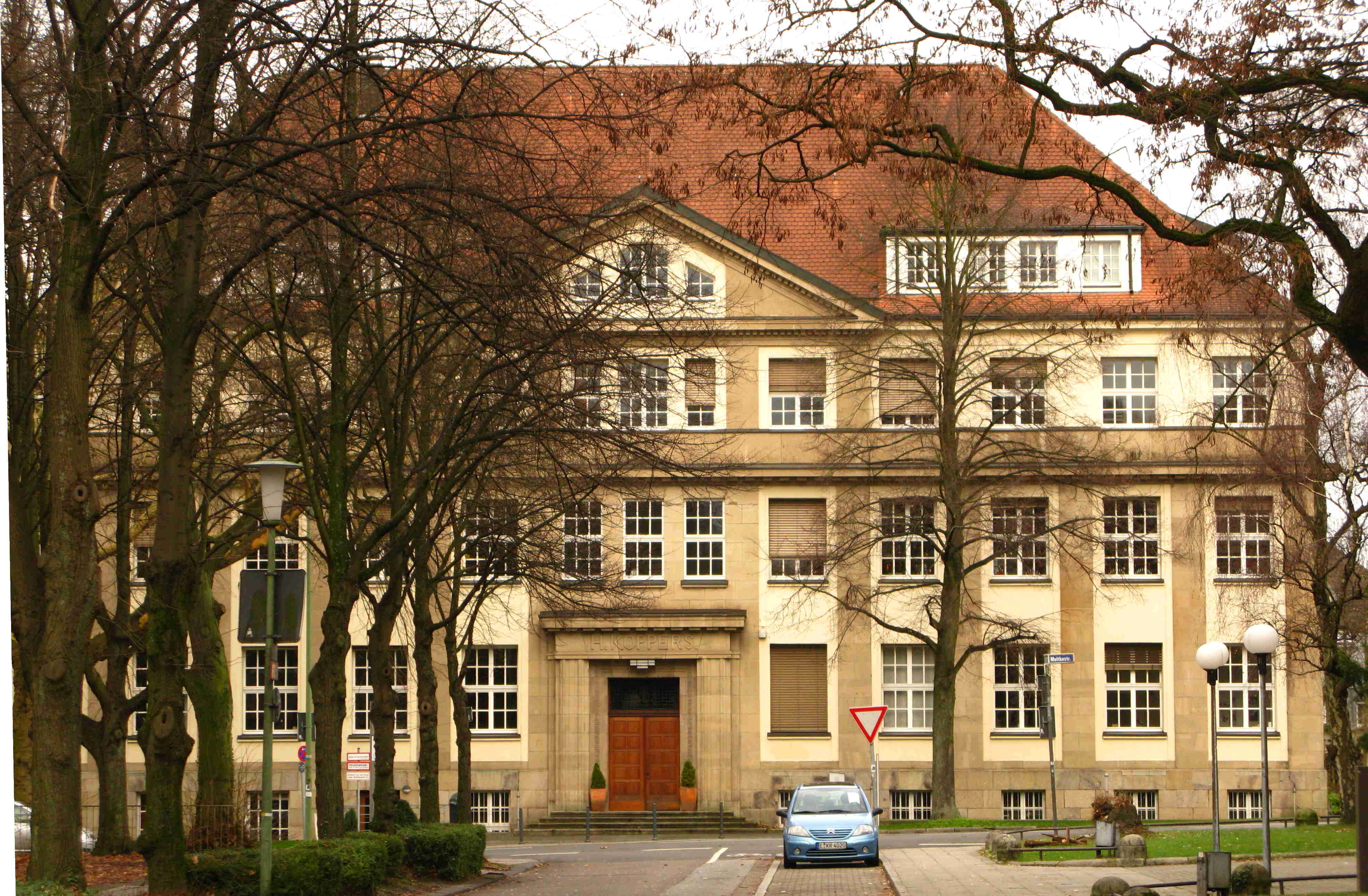
Moltkestrasse; former administrative building of the Heinrich Koppers company

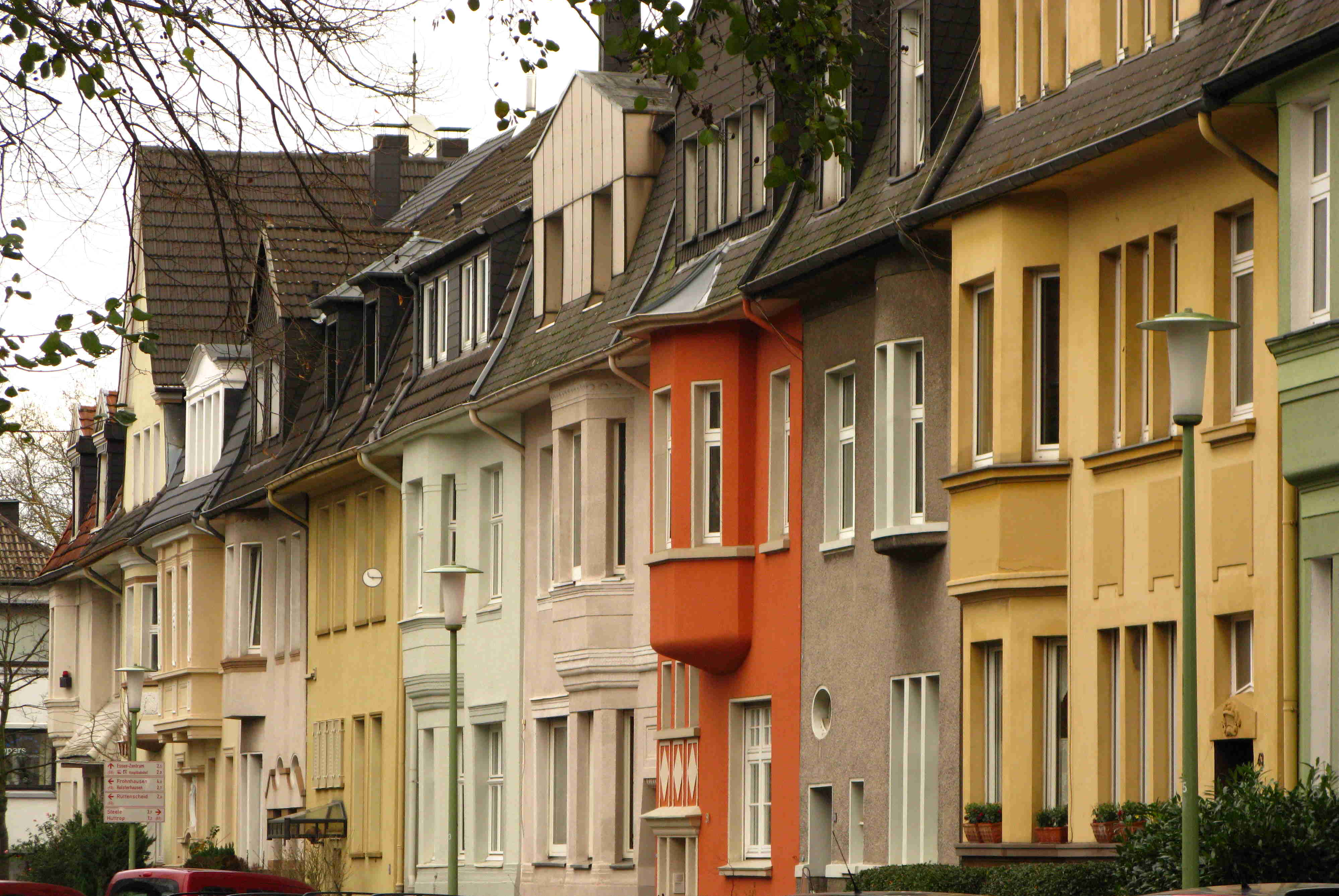
Upper Schinkelstrasse

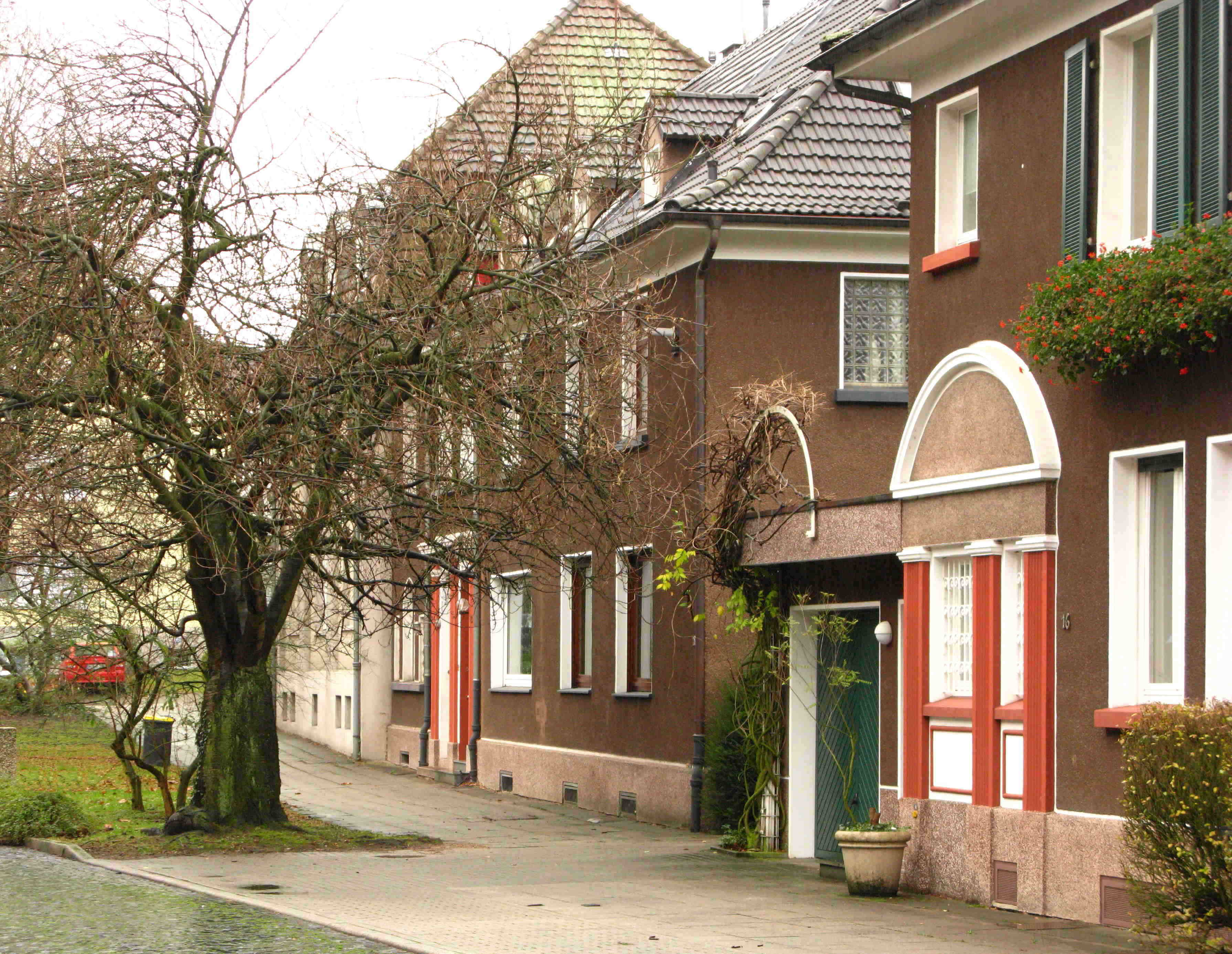
Private houses: Messelstrasse

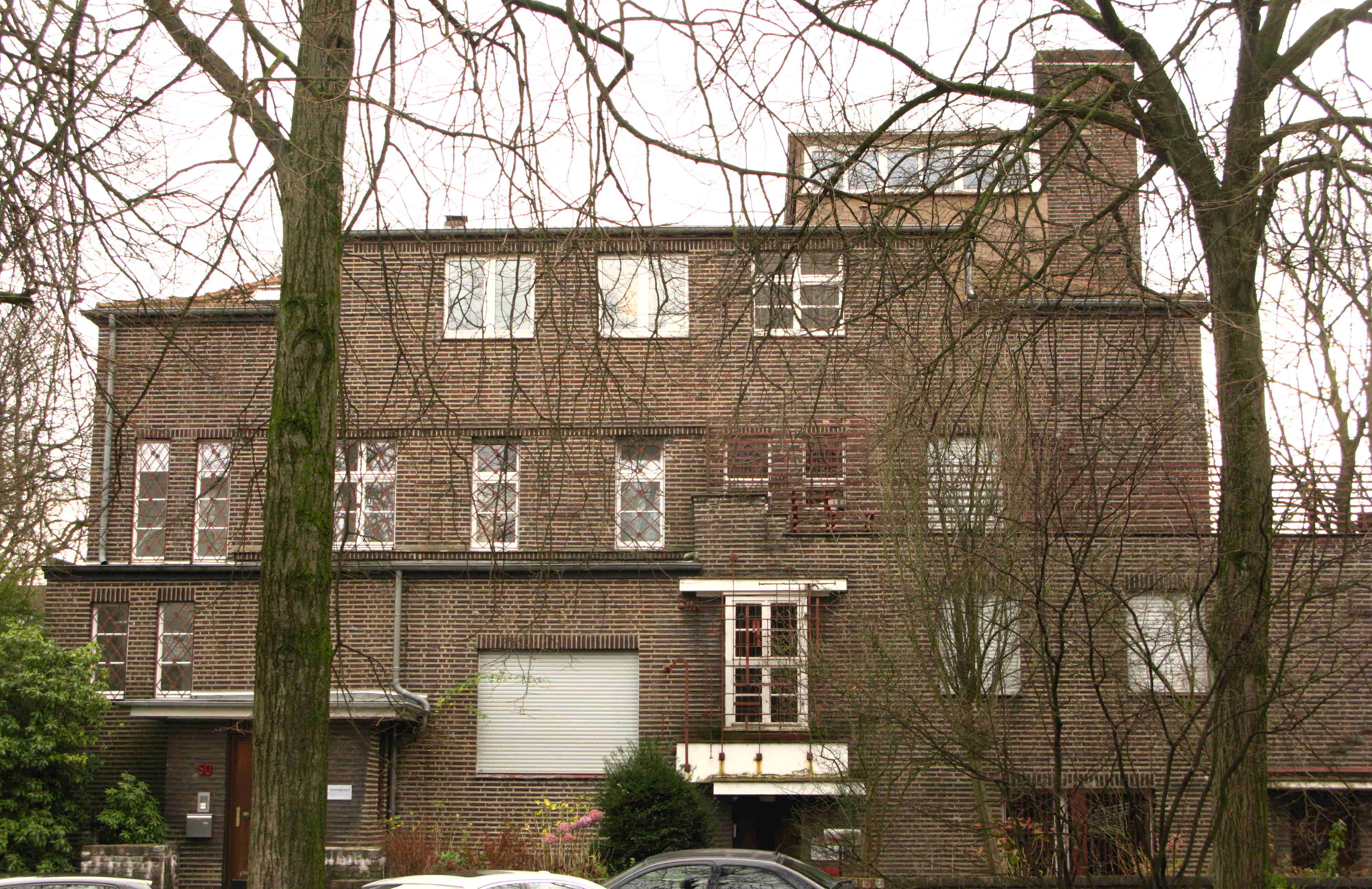
Residence and studio of the architect Edmund Körner

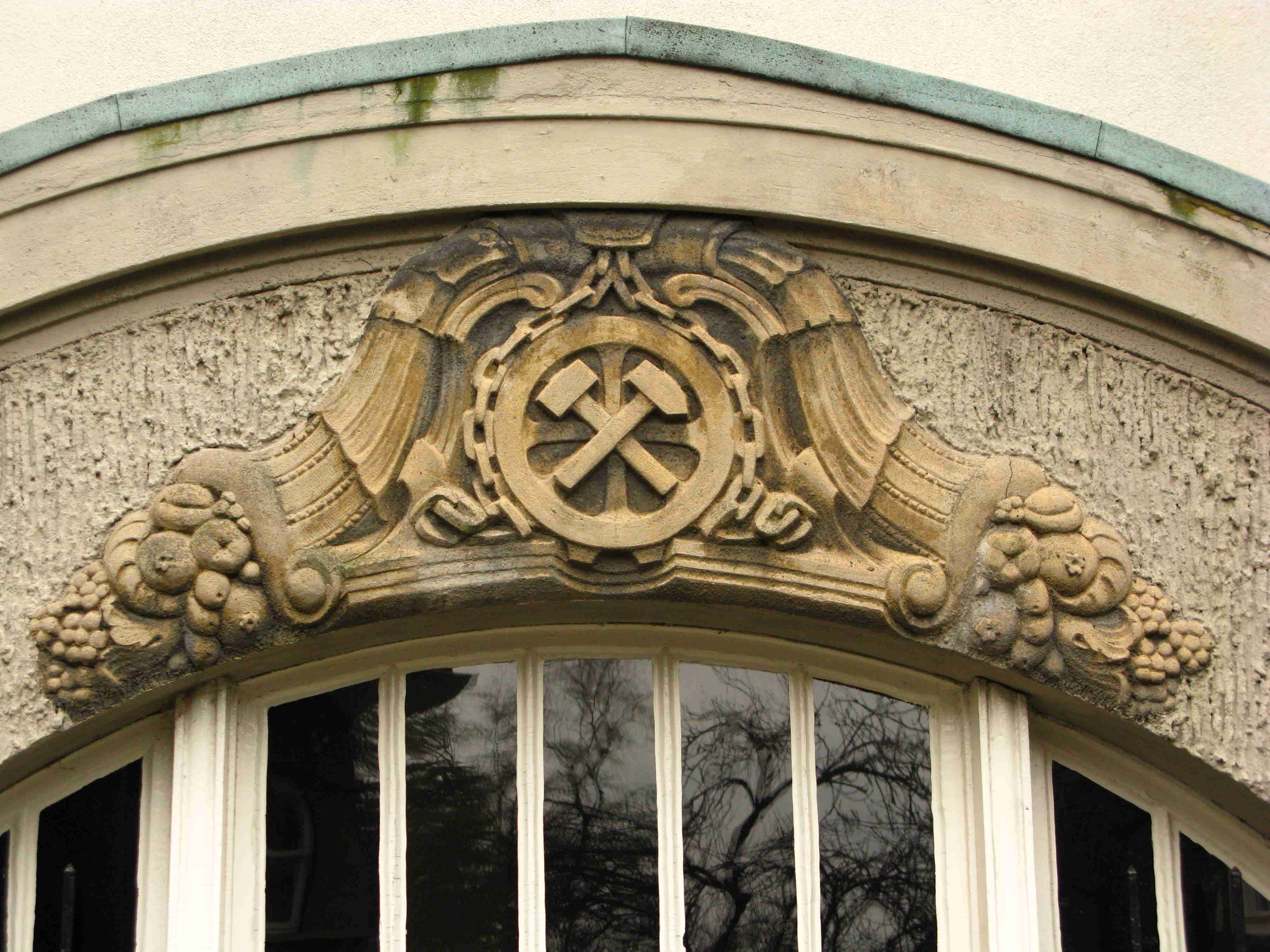
Essen was once a mining town: hammer and pick emblem over the entrance to a house in Schinkelstrasse

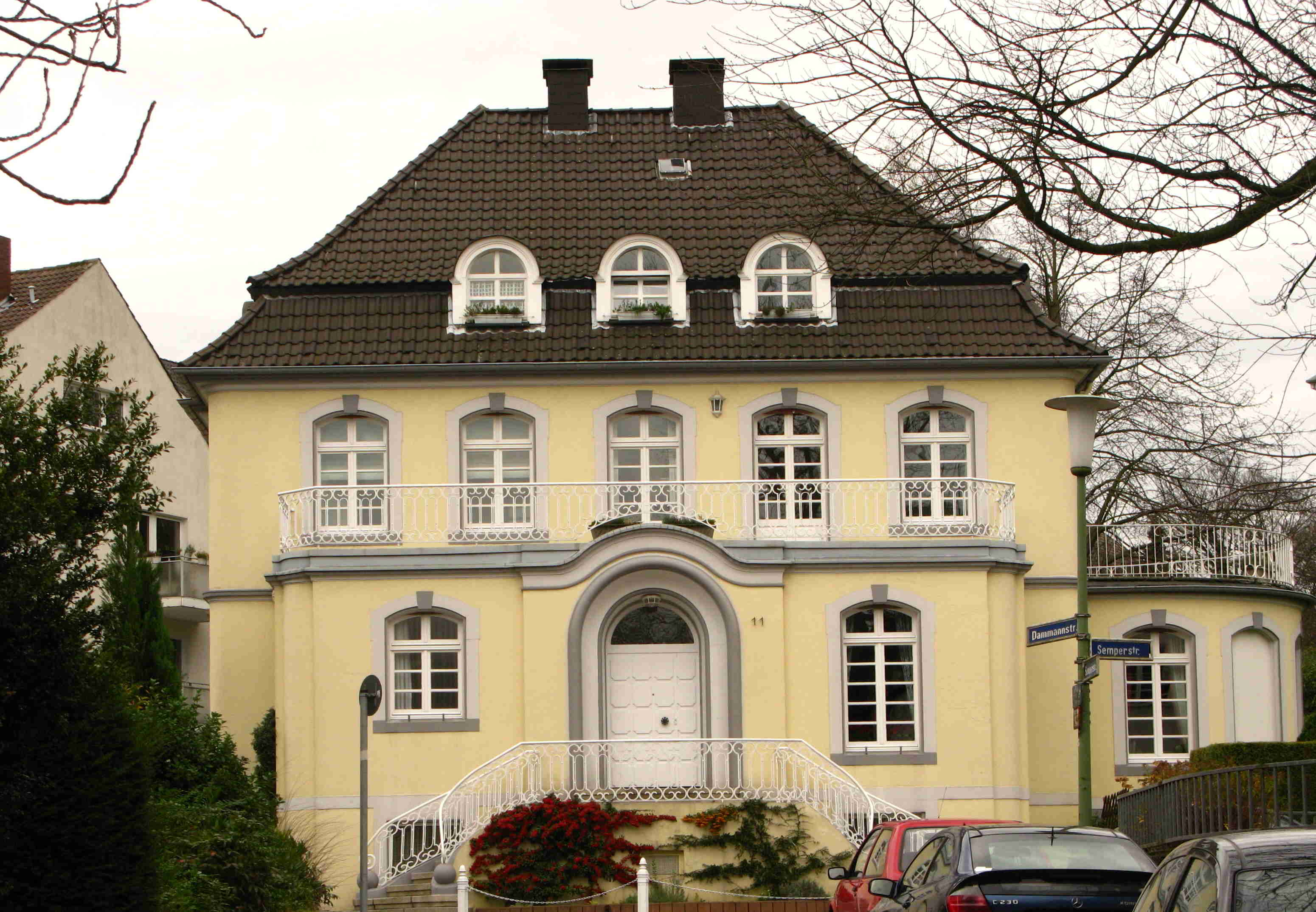
Residence at junction Semperstrasse/Dammannstrasse

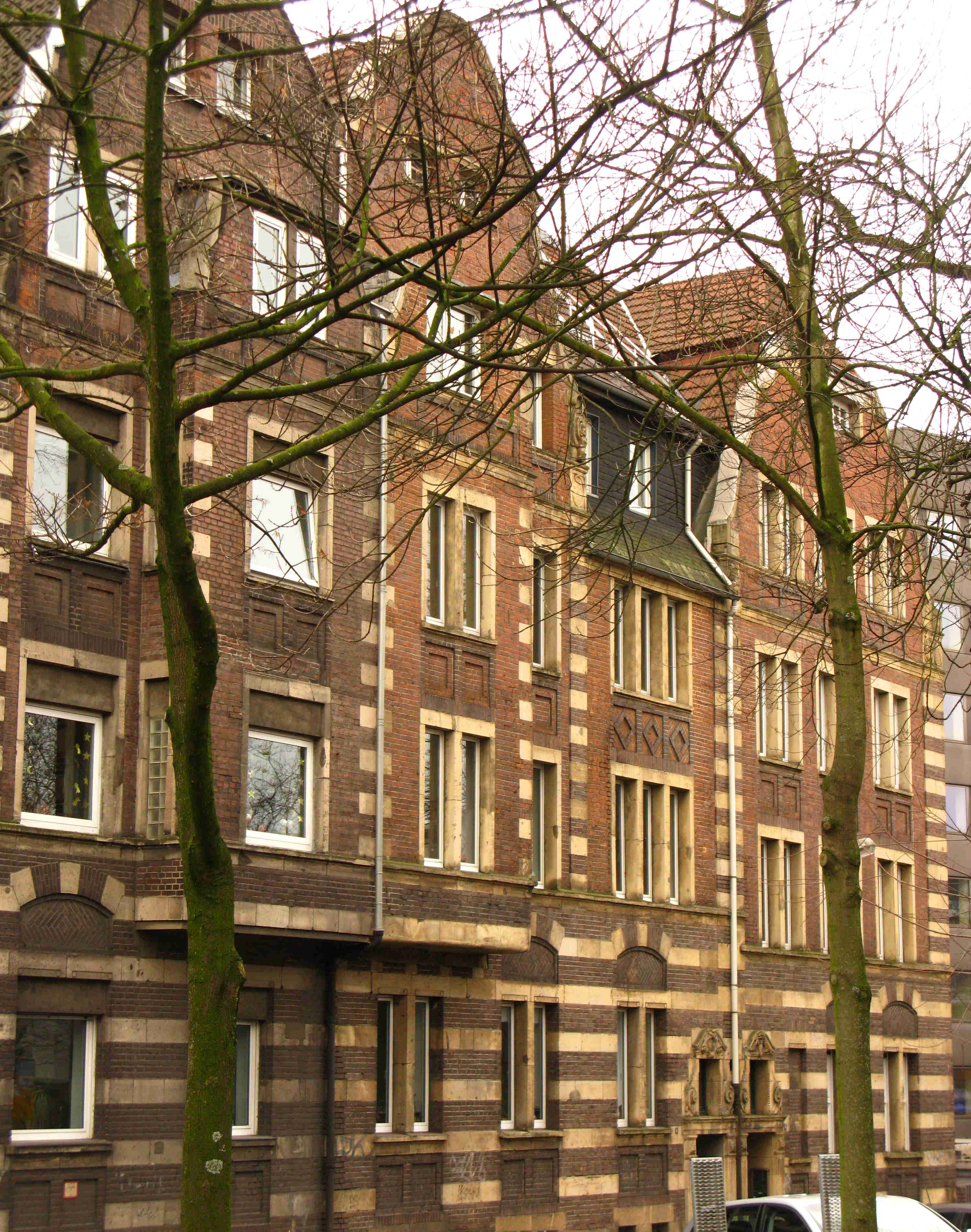
Lower Ruhrallee

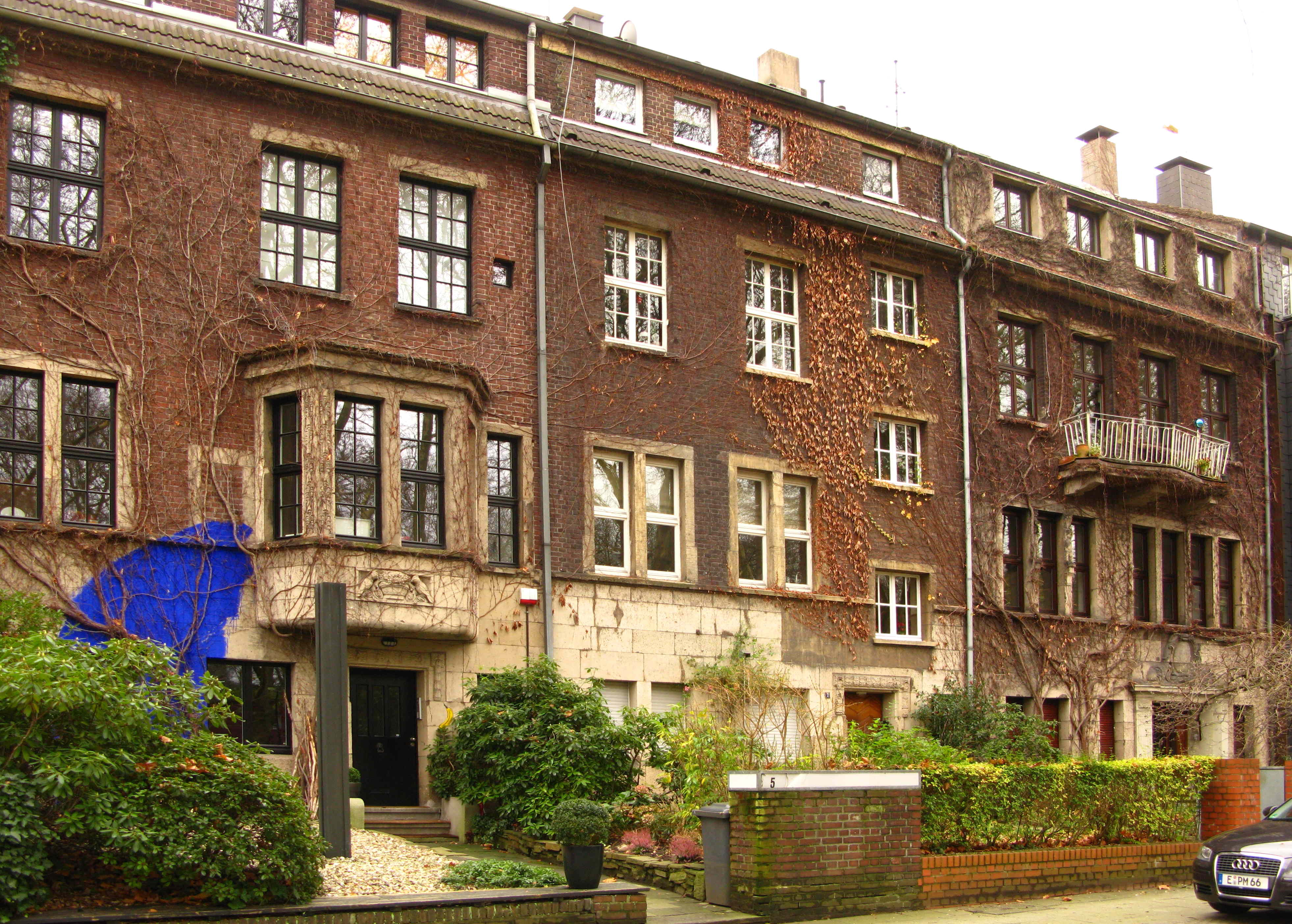
The northern Moltkeplatz; with stele by Jo Schöpfer and exterior work Blue Pigment by Katja Hajek

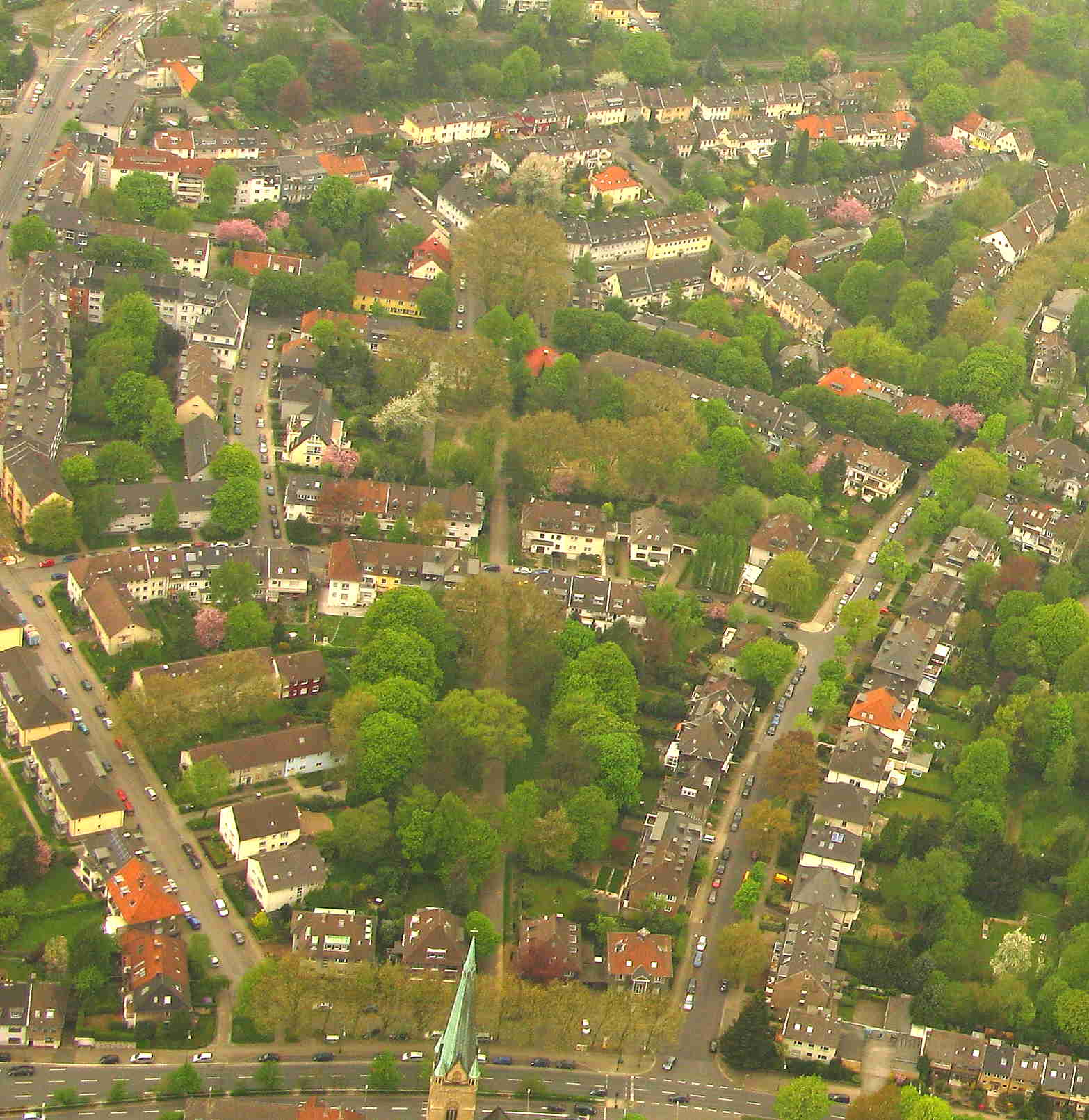
View over the Wiebe-Anlage park from the south-east (2009)

== Green spaces ==
Alongside the parks and the many old trees, the large front gardens provided for in Robert Schmidt's plans for the houses help make the Moltkeviertel into a garden city, especially when seen from above. But in contrast to a garden city in the original form, in the Moltkeviertel there is no spatial separation of working and living areas. Rather the workplaces – primarily educational, medical, administrative, engineering consulting and legal practices – are cheek by jowl with residential buildings. In a publication of the Bund Deutscher Architekten (German Architects' Federation) and the city of Essen dated 2004 (see below) it is stated that the Moltkeviertel was originally planned for approximately 4,000 residents and approximately 3,000 workplaces.

In the southern part of the Moltkeviertel, work started in 1925 on creating an unusual park in the form of the so-called Wiebe-Anlage – the first of its kind in Germany. This public park is located in an area enclosed by a block of houses. The back gardens of the individual houses border directly on the park with its children's playground and green areas.

== Contemporary art ==
Offering a sharp visual contrast to the adjacent terrace of old houses in the northern section of Moltkeplatz, the Essen gallery owner Jochen Krüper (died 2002) together with Uwe Rüth (formerly director of the Glaskasten Sculpture Museum Marl), began in 1981 to assemble on the Moltkeplatz green a high quality ensemble of contemporary sculptures (see Literature). It includes major works by Heinz Breloh, Christa Feuerberg, Hannes Forster, Gloria Friedmann, Lutz Fritsch, Friedrich Gräsel, Ansgar Nierhoff, and Ulrich Rückriem. These are now preserved and cared for under a sponsorship agreement by the association Kunst am Moltkeplatz e.V., which was formed by local residents. Alongside these permanent exhibits, the project "junge Kunst am Moltkeplatz" (young Art at Moltkeplatz) was started in 2010 which presents, for a fixed period in each case, a selected work of a young artist. At other locations in the Moltkeviertel, it is also possible to see contemporary art works in an external setting – for example at the corner of Moltkestrasse and Schinkelstrasse, sometimes on private land such as in the central section of Semperstrasse, and at the northern end of Moltkeplatz.

Sculptures at Moltkeplatz by …

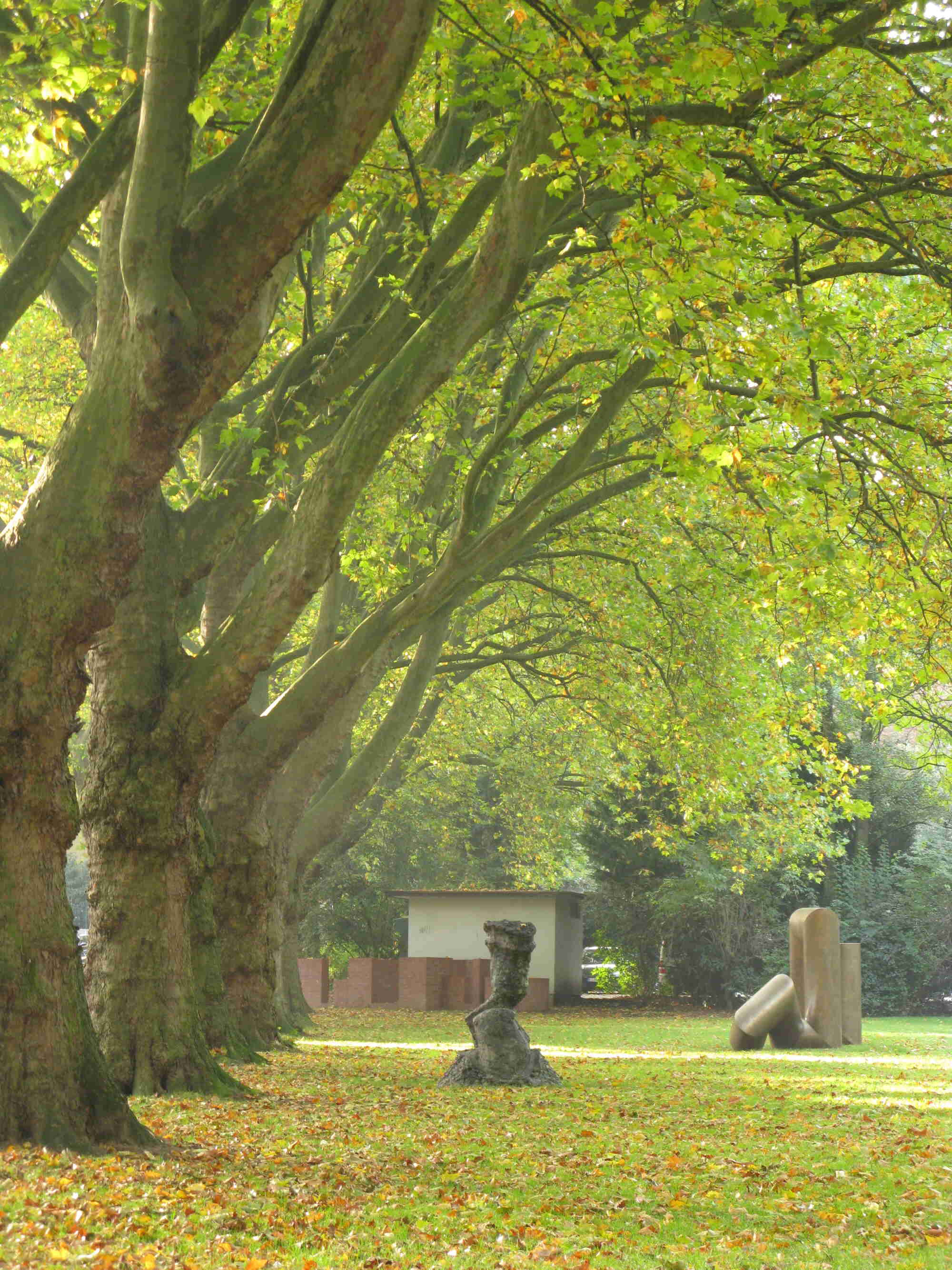
... Heinz Breloh, Friedrich Gräsel and Hannes Forster under 100-year-old plane trees

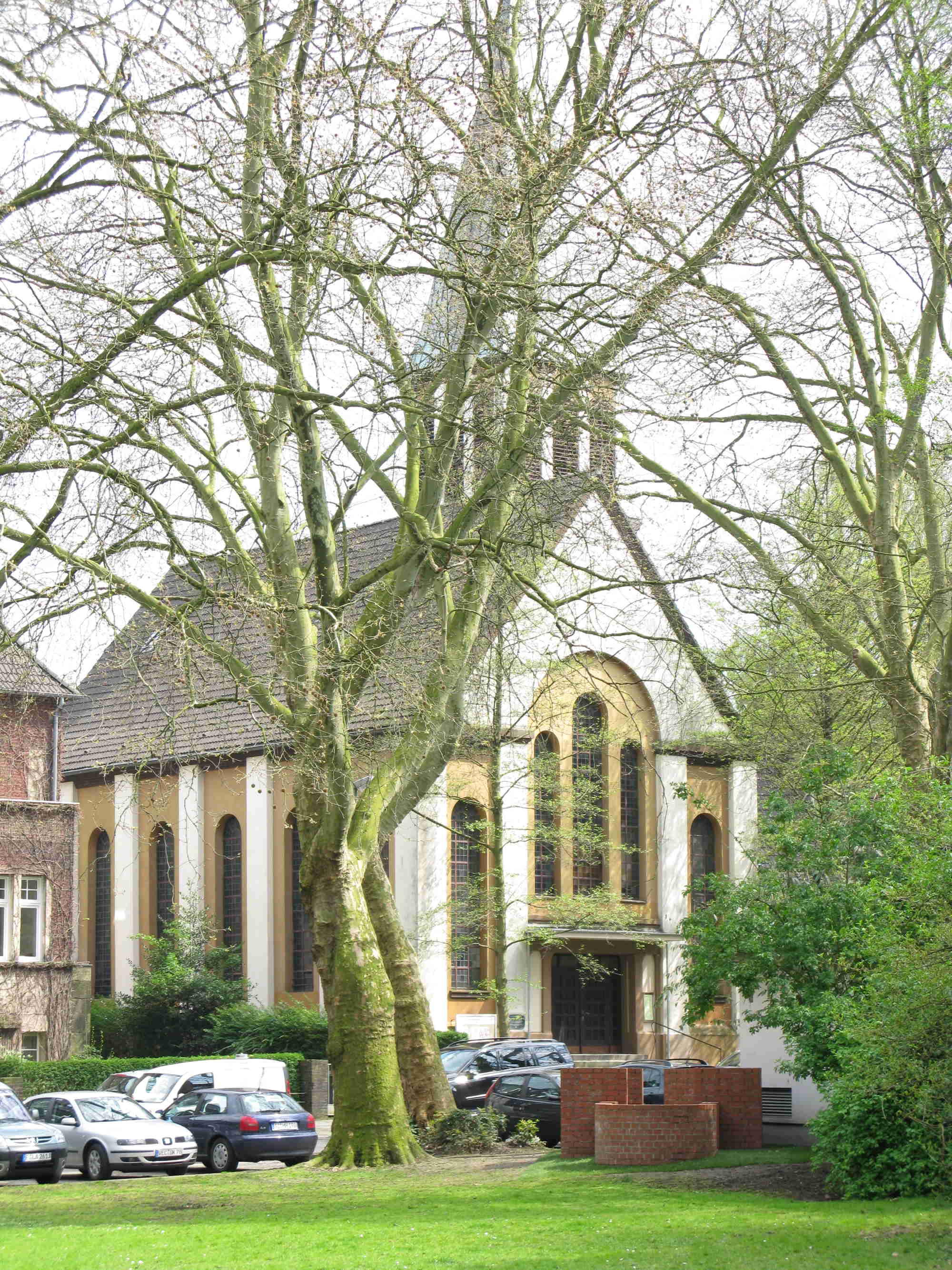
... Hannes Forster aligned towards the Lutheran Church (SELK), the first church building built by the architect Otto Bartning in Germany

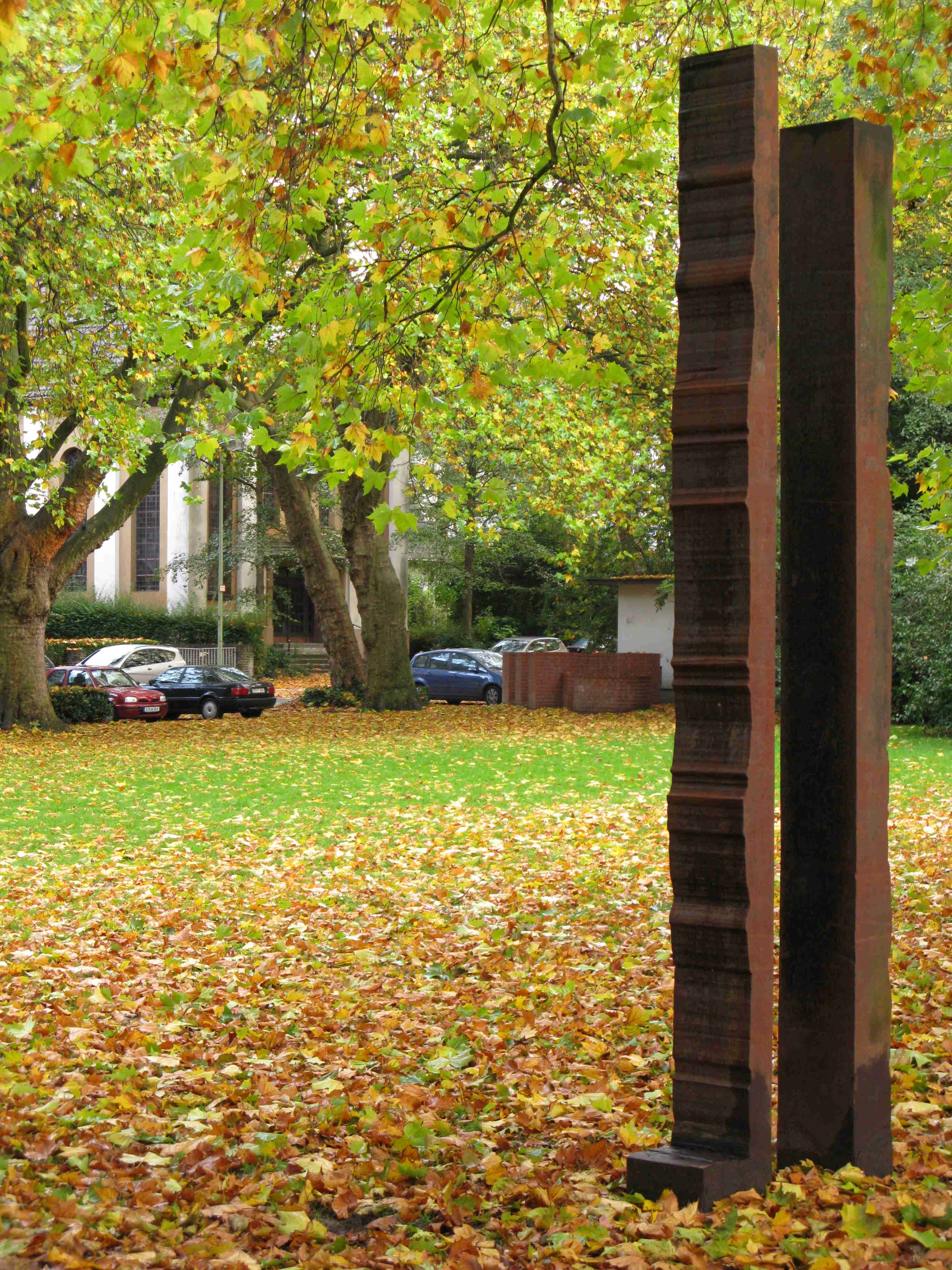
... Ansgar Nierhoff and Hannes Forster

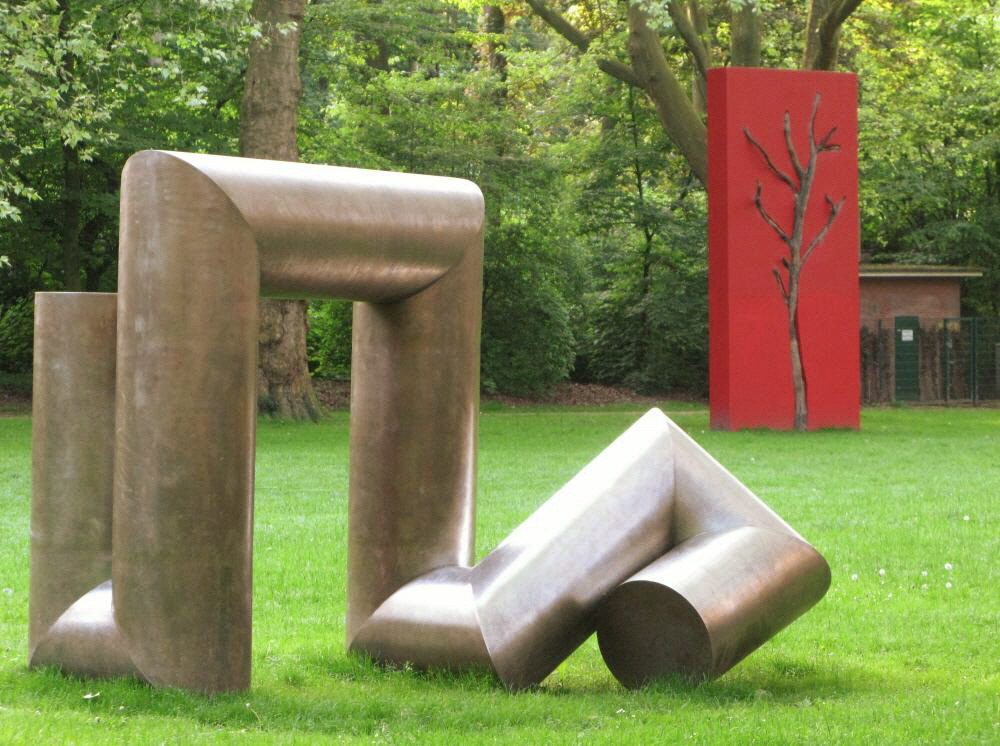
... Friedrich Gräsel and Gloria Friedmann

== Significant buildings ==
At Schinkelstrasse No. 34, there stands the former residence of Gustav Heinemann, Essen's first elected mayor after the Second World War and the third President of the Federal Republic of Germany. Moltkestrasse No. 31 is the Essen branch of the Deutsche Bundesbank (German Federal Bank). The hospital of the Huyssens Foundation on Henricistrasse and the Elisabeth Hospital on the opposite side of the Ruhrallee, together with their neighbouring medical facilities, constitute a major medical welfare and treatment complex. The Villa Koppers, Moltkeplatz No. 61, the former residence of the industrialist Heinrich Koppers, now houses the International School Ruhr.

In the year of the RUHR.2010 European Capital of Culture, the Independent Lutheran Church SELK parish celebrated the 100th anniversary of its listed church building designed by Otto Bartning. Later in the same year the residents at Moltkeplatz commemorated the naming of the square 100 years ago. The former Royal Building College Essen, built by Edmund Körner (now the Robert Schmidt Vocational College), will be 100 years old in 2011.

== Literature ==
- Tankred Stachelhaus: "Das Essener Moltkeviertel – Weltweit einzigartige RaumKunst", in Rheinische Kunststätten, vol. 521. Cologne 2010, ISBN 978-3-86526-051-2
- Silke Lück: "Das Moltkeviertel in Essen" in Rheinische Kunststätten, vol. 449. Cologne 2000, ISBN 3-88094-858-5 (This booklet is out of print; further information can be obtained from the association Kunst am Moltkeplatz; see weblinks)
- Bund Deutscher Architekten (German Architects' Federation) and City of Essen – Amt für Stadtplanung und Bauordnung (Office for Urban Planning and Construction Policy) (Ed.): Visionäres Essen – Von der Industriestadt zur Dienstleistungs-Metropole. (Catalogue for the exhibition of the same name (Part 1) on the occasion, among other things, of the city jubilee "1150 Years of the City and Foundation of Essen" in 2002 and in the Vienna Planning Workshop of the Municipality of the City of Vienna, MA 18 17 March, 6 April 2005, V.i.S.d.P. Ernst Kurz.) Essen 2004 (2nd, supplemented edition).
- Uwe Rüth (ed.): Material und Raum, Installationen + Projekte, Kunst im öffentlichen Raum. Galerie Heimeshoff Jochen Krüper, Essen 1990/1991, ISBN 3-928417-01-0 (This book is out of print; further information can be obtained from the association Kunst am Moltkeplatz; see weblinks).
