= Koppers =

Pittsburgh-based chemical company

Koppers Holdings, Inc.
- Type: Public
- Traded as: NYSE: KOP; S&P 600 Component
- Industry: Chemicals, railroad ties and other products, railroad bridge construction and repair, wood preservation
- Founded: 1912 (original company); 1988 (re-established)
- Headquarters: Koppers Tower; Pittsburgh, Pennsylvania
- Key people: Leroy M. Ball, President and Chief Executive Officer; Jimmi Sue Smith, Chief Financial Officer; James A. Sullivan, Executive Vice President and Chief Operating Officer; Stephen R. Tritch, Chairman of the Board of Directors
- Products: Coke; Wood processing; Coal tar; Crossties; Utility poles; Creosote; Carbon black; Phthalic anhydride
- Revenue: ▼US$1.88 billion (2025)
- Net income: ▲US$56.0 million (2025)
- Number of employees: 2,200
- Website: www.koppers.com

Koppers is a global chemical and materials company based in Pittsburgh, Pennsylvania, United States. Its headquarters is an art-deco 1920s skyscraper, the Koppers Tower.

== Structure ==
Koppers is an integrated global producer of carbon compounds, chemicals, and treated wood products for the aluminum, railroad, specialty chemical, utility, rubber, steel, residential lumber, and agriculture industries. It serves customers through a comprehensive global manufacturing and distribution network with facilities located in North America, South America, Australasia, China, and Europe.

Koppers operates four principal businesses: Performance Chemicals, Railroad Products and Services, Utility and Industrial Products, and Carbon Materials and Chemicals.

== History ==
In 1912 immigrant German engineer Heinrich Koppers founded Koppers Company in Chicago, Illinois. In 1915 the organization moved to Pittsburgh, Pennsylvania. The company founder's interest in the company was bought out by Pittsburgh financier Andrew Mellon, who became a large shareholder. The landmark Koppers Building in downtown Pittsburgh opened in 1929.

In 1943, Koppers, at the US government's behest, built a factory in Kobuta, Pennsylvania on the Ohio River downriver from Beaver, to manufacture styrene-butadiene monomer, a building block used to make a form of synthetic rubber for the World War II defense effort.

In 1951, at Port Arthur, Texas, the company built a plant to manufacture ethylbenzene, using as raw materials ethylene from the nearby Gulf Oil refinery, and benzene, which was a byproduct of the company's coke ovens in Pennsylvania, which was shipped to Texas by barge. The ethylbenzene produced there was then shipped by barge back to the Kobuta plant where it was converted to styrene monomer, and then polymerized to make expandable polystyrene. In the early 1950s, the company purchased a license to manufacture polyethylene at its Port Arthur plant. These chemical operations later were the basis for forming a new corporate entity with Sinclair Oil Corporation to form the Sinclair-Koppers Company in 1965.

In the 1960s, Koppers opened a Noise Control division and manufactured prefabricated sound traps.

In 2001, the company had to close a wood treatment plant in Oroville, California due to contamination of the 205 acre facility and the surrounding area. Chemicals like PCP and chromium were found to have been leaked into the local drinking water supply.

In August 2023, the company amounted that they would invest $17 Million USD to establish new manufacturing facility in Louisiana.

== Beazer hostile takeover ==
In early 1988 Beazer, a British conglomerate run by one of the foremost corporate raiders of the 1980s, successfully launched a hostile takeover of Koppers Company for $1.81 billion ($5.1 billion today). The sale was completed on June 17, 1988. A smaller, more streamlined domestic business unit of Koppers Company, Koppers Industries was bought back by local management later in 1988. Although much simpler than the once sprawling chemical and aggregate conglomerate of the early-to-mid 20th century, Koppers Industries once again become successful at its core businesses. In 2006 the new Beazer-free independent Koppers Incorporated again went public.

== International business interests ==
Koppers operates facilities in the United States, Canada, United Kingdom, Denmark, Australia, New Zealand and China. The coal tar processor Cindu Chemicals in the Netherlands was acquired in 2010. Koppers sources coal tar from around the world for further processing by distillation into carbon chemicals.

== Products ==
In North America, Koppers is the largest provider of railroad crossties for the Class I Railroads and are known for pre-plated crossties.

Koppers Carbon Materials and Chemicals are used in the production of a variety of manufactured goods including aluminum, steel, plastics, resins, treated wood, and rubber products. These products also increase the durability and extend the life of products such as railroad ties, utility and transmission poles, and marine pilings. A Koppers primary raw material is coal tar. Asphalt sealants produced from coal tar contain benzo(a)pyrene and other toxic chemicals known collectively as polycyclic aromatic hydrocarbons, or PAHs.

== See also ==
- Heinrich Koppers
