= VV Humann Essen =

German volleyball club

VV Humann Essen (the abbreviation for "Volleyball Verein Humann Essen, English: "Volleyball Club Humann Essen") is a volleyball club in Essen, Germany.

The club was founded in 1967 and has achieved some success, most recently appearing in the top German volleyball league in the 2005–06 season, having achieved the feat of a perfect series in the 2004–05 season on the way to promotion.
