= Germany at the 2025 Summer World University Games =

Germany at the 2025 World University Games
- IOC code: GER
- NOC: Allgemeiner Deutscher Hochschulsportverband (ADH)
- Website: www.adh.de

in Rhine-Ruhr metropolitan region, Germany 16 July 2025 – 27 July 2025
- Competitors: 297 in 18 sports
- Flag bearers: Supharada Kisskalt (taekwondo); Sören Seebold (wheelchair 3x3 basketball)
- Medals Ranked 6th: Gold 11 Silver 12 Bronze 17 Total 40

Germany competes at the 2025 Summer World University Games in the Rhine-Ruhr metropolitan region from 16 to 27 July 2025. It is the second time Germany acts as host following the 1989 Summer Universiade. Germany was represented by 305 athletes who won 49 medals and finished sixth place in the medal standings. The flag bearers were Supharada Kisskalt (taekwondo) and Sören Seebold (wheelchair 3x3 basketball).

== Medalists ==
=== Medal by sports ===
Rank	Sports	Gold	Silver	Bronze	Total
1	Diving	3	2	4	9
2	Athletics	2	3	4	9
3	Judo	1	1	1	3
3	Rhythmic gymnastics	1	1	1	3
5	Water polo	1	0	1	2
6	3x3 basketball	1	0	0	1
6	3x3 wheelchair basketball	1	0	0	1
6	Beach volleyball	1	0	0	1
9	Rowing	0	3	0	3
10	Taekwondo	0	1	2	3
11	Swimming	0	1	0	1
12	Artistic gymnastics	0	0	1	1
12	Fencing	0	0	1	1
12	Table tennis	0	0	1	1
12	Tennis	0	0	1	1
Totals (15 entries)		11	12	17	40

Source: rhineruhr2025.com

=== Medalists ===
Medal	Name	Sport	Event	Date
Gold	Lena Hentschel; Luis Avila Sanchez	Diving	Mixed synchronized 3 metre springboard	17 July
Gold	Moritz Wesemann	Diving	Men's 3 metre springboard	18 July
Gold	Margarita Kolosov	Gymnastics	Women's ball	19 July
Gold	Jette Müller; Moritz Wesemann; Pauline Pfeif; Moritz Wesemann	Diving	Team event	19 July
Gold	Germany women's wheelchair 3×3 team: Lilly Sellak; Svenja Erni; Catharina Weiß; Lisa Bergenthal	Basketball	Women's wheelchair 3×3 tournament	20 July
Gold	Germany women's 3×3 team: Laura Zolper; Elisa Mevius; Luisa Nufer; Sarah Polleros	Basketball	Women's 3×3 tournament	20 July
Gold	Mika Sosna	Athletics	Men's discus throw	22 July
Gold	Anna Monta Olek	Judo	Women's –78 kg	24 July
Gold	Philipp Huster; Maximilian Just	Beach volleyball	Men's tournament	26 July
Gold	Germany women's water polo team: Darja Heinbichner; Franka Lipinski; Ioanna Petiki; Sinia Plotz; Emma-Eliza Koch; Emma Seehafer; Anne Rieck; Mona Saternus; Greta Tadday; Elena Ludwig; Jana Stuwe; Marijke Kijlstra	Water polo	Women's tournament	26 July
Gold	Vivienne Morgenstern; Mona Mayer; Sabrina Heil; Yasmin Amaadacho; Jenna Fee Feyerabend	Athletics	Women's 4 × 400 metres relay	27 July
Silver	Carolina Coordes; Pauline Pfeif	Diving	Women's synchronized 10 metre platform	17 July
Silver	Anastasia Simakova	Gymnastics	Women's hoop	19 July
Silver	Luis Avila Sanchez; Jaden Eikermann	Diving	Men's synchronized 10 metre platform	20 July
Silver	Supharada Kisskalt	Taekwondo	Women's –49 kg	20 July
Silver	Björn Kammann	Swimming	Men's 100 metre butterfly	22 July
Silver	Steven Richter	Athletics	Men's discus throw	22 July
Silver	Merlin Hummel	Athletics	Men's hammer throw	23 July
Silver	Samira Bock	Judo	Women's –70 kg	24 July
Silver	Nick Thumm	Athletics	Men's javelin throw	25 July
Silver	Alexandra Föster	Rowing	Women's single sculls	27 July
Silver	Luise Bachmann; Olivia Clotten; Paula Hartmann; Lene Mührs	Rowing	Women's coxless four	27 July
Silver	Helena Brenke; Sydney Garbers; Oskar Kroglowski; Tjorven Schneider	Rowing	Mixed quadruple sculls	27 July
Bronze	Moritz Schenkel	Fencing	Men's sabre	17 July
Bronze	Leah Lawall; Adina Machwirth; Anna Siepmann	Taekwondo	Women's team poomsae	18 July
Bronze	Lena Hentschel; Jette Müller	Diving	Mixed synchronized 3 metre springboard	18 July
Bronze	Anastasia Simakova	Gymnastics	Women's ball	19 July
Bronze	Matthias Danzer; Kirill Fadeev; Timotius Köchting; Benno Oehme	Table tennis	Men's team	19 July
Bronze	Pauline Pfeif	Diving	Women's 10 metre platform	20 July
Bronze	Lena Hentschel	Diving	Women's 3 metre springboard	21 July
Bronze	Tim Axer	Diving	Men's 1 metre springboard	22 July
Bronze	Laura Göbel; Kaan Gümüs; Jona Pörsch; Supharada Kisskalt	Taekwondo	Mixed team kyorugi	23 July
Bronze	Helen Habib	Judo	Women's –48 kg	23 July
Bronze	Alessio Vasquez	Tennis	Men's singles	23 July
Bronze	Antonia Kinzel	Athletics	Women's discus throw	24 July
Bronze	Luka Herden	Athletics	Men's long jump	24 July
Bronze	Germany men's water polo team: Max Spittank; Zoran Bozic; Tobias Bauer; Elias Metten; Jan Rotermund; Moritz Ostmann; Finn Rotermund; Yannek Chiru; Sascha Seifert; Till Hofmann; Luk Jaschke; Mark Gansen	Water polo	Men's tournament	26 July
Bronze	Emma Malewski	Gymnastics	Women's balance beam	26 July
Bronze	Adia Budde	Athletics	Women's 3000 metres steeplechase	27 July
Bronze	Jolina Ernst; Svenja Pfetsch; Talea Prepens; Louise Wieland	Athletics	Women's 4 × 100 metres relay	27 July

== Archery ==
Recurve

Athlete	Event	Ranking round		Round of 128	Round of 64	Round of 32	Round of 16	Quarterfinals	Semifinals	Final / BM	
Athlete	Event	Score	Seed	Opposition Score	Opposition Score	Opposition Score	Opposition Score	Opposition Score	Opposition Score	Opposition Score	Rank
Phil Lüttmerding	Men's individual	629	40	Olsson (SWE); L 4–6	Did not advance						
Jonathan Vetter	Men's individual	647	22	Bye	Bąk (POL); W 7–3	Pedoux (FRA); W 6–0	Cowles (USA); W 7–3	Tang (TPE); L 4–6	Did not advance		
Moritz Wieser	Men's individual	654	12	Bye	McLean (NZL); W 6–4	Piggott (GBR); W 6–2	Kuo (TPE); W 6–0	Qin (CHN); L 0–6	Did not advance		
Phil Lüttmerding; Jonathan Vetter; Moritz Wieser	Men's team	1930	7	—N/a		Bye	Italy; L 3–5	Did not advance			
Regina Kellerer	Women's individual	614	41	Luige (EST); W 6–2	Jaiswal (IND); W 6–4	Fong (TPE); L 4–6	Did not advance				
Johanna Klinger	Women's individual	649	10	Bye	Derebasi (TUR); W 6–5	Pintaric (SLO); W 6–5	Asakuno (JPN); L 5–6	Did not advance			
Clea Reisenweber	Women's individual	621	34	Saleha (PAK); W 6–0	Lilienthal (EST); W 6–0	Huang (CHN); L 0–6	Did not advance				
Regina Kellerer; Johanna Klinger; Clea Reisenweber	Women's team	1884	8	—N/a		Bye	Ukraine; W 6–2	China; L 0–6	Did not advance		
Johanna Klinger; Moritz Wieser	Mixed team	1303	7	—N/a		Bye	Turkey; W 5–1	United States; L 1–5	Did not advance		

Compound

Athlete	Event	Ranking round		Round of 128	Round of 64	Round of 32	Round of 16	Quarterfinals	Semifinals	Final / BM	
Athlete	Event	Score	Seed	Opposition Score	Opposition Score	Opposition Score	Opposition Score	Opposition Score	Opposition Score	Opposition Score	Rank
Ruven Flüß	Men's individual	697	7	Bye		Yildiz (TUR); W 145–143	Akcaoglu (TUR); W 145*–145	Dalal (IND); L 146–148	Did not advance		
Jonathan Gräfe	Men's individual	677	41	Bye	Mohamad Norwafi (MAS); W 140–139	Kunsch (GER); L 137–144	Did not advance				
Paolo Kunsch	Men's individual	696	9	Bye	Hryhoryev (POR); W 147–136	Gräfe (GER); W 144–137	Tyutyun (KAZ); L 145–145*	Did not advance			
Ruven Flüß; Jonathan Gräfe; Paolo Kunsch	Men's team	2070	6	—N/a			Kazakhstan; W 233–226	Turkey; L 225–236	Did not advance		

== Athletics ==
Track and road events
Men

Athlete	Event	Heat		Semifinal		Final	
Athlete	Event	Result	Rank	Result	Rank	Result	Rank
Maurice Grahl	100 m	10.61	15 q	10.68	20	Did not advance	
Lukas Ehrle	10,000 m	—N/a				29:55.97	19
Felix Julian Frühn; Emilio González; Fabian Olbert; Eddie Reddemann	4 × 100 m relay	39.63	5 Q	—N/a		39.46	6
Artur Beimler	Half marathon	—N/a				1:05:32	11
Jassam Abu El Wafa	20 km walk	—N/a				1:24:56 PB	15
Johannes Frenzl	20 km walk	—N/a				1:24:12	14
Frederik Weigel	20 km walk	—N/a				1:23:20 PB	13
Jassam Abu El Wafa; Johannes Frenzl; Frederik Weigel	20 km walk team	—N/a				4:12:28	4

Women

Athlete	Event	Heat		Semifinal		Final	
Athlete	Event	Result	Rank	Result	Rank	Result	Rank
Annkathrin Hoven	400 m	53.35	8 Q	52.95	11	Did not advance	
Jana Lakner	400 m	52.26	1 Q	52.37	2 Q	52.57	5
Smilla Kolbe	800 m	2:05.66	14 Q	2:01.89	3 Q	2:01.42	5
Carolina Schäfer	5000 m	15:55.69	4 Q	—N/a		15:41.82 PB	7
Pia Schlattmann	5000 m	16:34.23	15 Q	—N/a		15:40.19 PB	5
Kira Weis	10,000 m	—N/a				DNF	
Rosina Schneider	100 m hurdles	13.18	11 Q	13.27	15	Did not advance	
Franziska Schuster	100 m hurdles	13.13	8 Q	12.92 PB	2 Q	13.03	6
Yasmin Amaadacho	400 m hurdles	56.96	8 Q	56.60	6 q	56.05 PB	4
Sabrina Heil	400 m hurdles	57.19	12 Q	58.02	21	Did not advance	
Adia Budde	3000 m steeplechase	9:59.52	7 Q	—N/a		9:33.34	3rd place, bronze medalist(s)
Carolin Hinrichs	3000 m steeplechase	10:09.98	14 Q	—N/a		9:57.09	12
Jolina Ernst; Svenja Pfetsch; Talea Prepens; Louise Wieland	4 × 100 m relay	43.58	1 Q	—N/a		43.60	3rd place, bronze medalist(s)
Vivienne Morgenstern; Mona Mayer; Sabrina Heil; Yasmin Amaadacho; Jenna Fee Feyerabend (heats)	4 × 400 m relay	3:36.31	5 Q	—N/a		3:29.68 SB	1st place, gold medalist(s)
Mia Jurenka	Half marathon	—N/a				1:13:42	6
Ada Junghannß	20 km walk	—N/a				1:38:20	17
Tabea Kiefer	20 km walk	—N/a				1:41:20	21

Field events
Men

Athlete	Event	Qualification		Final	
Athlete	Event	Distance	Position	Distance	Position
Simon Batz	Long jump	7.89	2 q	7.87	4
Luka Herden	Long jump	7.96	1 Q	7.89	3rd place, bronze medalist(s)
Tizian Lauria	Shot put	19.09	5 q	19.66	5
Kevin Reim	Shot put	18.43	8 q	18.34	10
Steven Richter	Discus throw	61.15	2 Q	61.77	2nd place, silver medalist(s)
Mika Sosna	Discus throw	61.33	1 Q	64.26	1st place, gold medalist(s)
Merlin Hummel	Hammer throw	75.76	1 Q	77.03	2nd place, silver medalist(s)
Nick Thumm	Javelin throw	75.39	3 q	78.47	2nd place, silver medalist(s)

Women

Athlete	Event	Qualification		Final	
Athlete	Event	Distance	Position	Distance	Position
Bianca Stichling	High jump	1.81	1 q	1.81	8
Chiara Sistermann	Pole vault	4.05	13	Did not advance	
Samira Attermeyer	Long jump	6.22	9 q	DNS	
Finja Köchling	Long jump	6.03	18	Did not advance	
Caroline Joyeux	Triple jump	DNS			
Sarah-Michelle Kudla	Triple jump	13.67	2 q	13.50	5
Antonia Kinzel	Discus throw	57.36	3 q	58.43	3rd place, bronze medalist(s)
Joyce Oguama	Discus throw	54.88	6 q	58.07	5
Samantha Borutta	Hammer throw	65.06	9 q	67.35	4
Aileen Kuhn	Hammer throw	69.20	3 Q	67.02	5
Julia Ulbricht	Javelin throw	55.27	5 q	56.07	5

Combined event – Women's heptathlon

Athlete	Event	100H	HJ	SP	200 m	LJ	JT	800 m	Final	Rank
Jenna Fee Feyerabend	Result	14.27	1.71	12.93	26.83 SB	5.52	41.67	2:21.02	5472	11
Jenna Fee Feyerabend	Points	941	867	723	726	706	699	810	5472	11

== Badminton ==
Men

Athlete	Event	Round of 128	Round of 64	Round of 32	Round of 16	Quarter-final	Semi-final	Final / BM	
Athlete	Event	Opposition Score	Opposition Score	Opposition Score	Opposition Score	Opposition Score	Opposition Score	Opposition Score	Rank
Matthias Kicklitz	Singles	Bye	de Silva (SRI); W 2–0 (15–12, 15–5)	Kadlec (SVK); W (15–8, 15–9)	Anandas (IND); W (7–15, 18–16, 15–9)	Zhou (CHN); L (15–13, 13–15, 14–16)	Did not advance		
Kian-Yu Oei	Singles	Bye	Papai (HUN); W 2–0 (15–10, 15–4)	Anandas (IND); L 0–2 (9–15, 8–15)	Did not advance				
Malik Bourakkadi; David Eckerlin	Doubles	—N/a	Bye	Dresp / Krax (GER); W (15–13, 16–14)	Cattoen / Renoir (FRA); L (10–15, 15–12, 20–21)	Did not advance			
Jonathan Dresp; Simon Krax	Doubles	—N/a	Saigh / Sardar (KSA); W 2–0 (15–6, 15–4)	Bourakkadi / Eckerlin (GER); L 0–2 (13–15, 14–16)	Did not advance				

Women

Athlete	Event	Round of 128	Round of 64	Round of 32	Round of 16	Quarter-final	Semi-final	Final / BM	
Athlete	Event	Opposition Score	Opposition Score	Opposition Score	Opposition Score	Opposition Score	Opposition Score	Opposition Score	Rank
Miranda Wilson	Singles	Bye	Kawthar (KSA); W 2–0 (15–5, 15–11)	Lin (USA); L 0–2 (9–15, 8–15)	Did not advance				
Leona Michalski; Thuc Phuong Nguyen	Doubles	—N/a	Bye	Abdelkader / Rabie (EGY); W 2–0 (15–6, 15–3)	Imaizumi / Kobayashi (JPN); L (15–13, 4–15, 13–15)	Did not advance			

Mixed

Athlete	Event	Group stage			Round of 64	Round of 32	Round of 16	Quarter-final	Semi-final	Final / BM	
Athlete	Event	Opposition Score	Opposition Score	Rank	Opposition Score	Opposition Score	Opposition Score	Opposition Score	Opposition Score	Opposition Score	Rank
Malik Bourakkadi; Leona Michalski	Doubles	—N/a			Yap / Chan (SGP); W 2–0 (15–6, 15–1)	Franco / Jimenez (ESP); W (13–15, 15–11, 15–11)	Cattoen / Vallet (FRA); W 2–1 (15–13, 9–15, 15–2)	Lin / Jheng (TPE); L 0–2 (8–15, 9–15)	Did not advance		
Jonathan Dresp; Thuc Phuong Nguyen	Doubles	—N/a			Tajibullayev / Jumadilova (KAZ); W 2–0 (15–5, 15–6)	Kuvale / Khan (IND); W 2–1 (13–15, 15–8, 15–9)	Lock / Hoang (CAN); W 2–0 (15–7, 15–12)	Liao / Li (CHN); L 0–2 (10–15, 7–15)	Did not advance		
David Eckerlin; Miranda Wilson	Doubles	—N/a			Teerawiwat / Povanon (THA); L 0–2 (8–15, 8–15)	Did not advance					
Malik Bourakkadi; Jonathan Dresp; David Eckerlin; Matthias Kicklitz; Simon Krax; Kian-Yu Oei; Leona Michalski; Thuc Phuong Nguyen; Miranda Wilson	Team	Chinese Taipei; L 2–3	—N/a	2 Q	—N/a		China; L 0–3	Classification Match 9th-16th Netherlands; W 3–0	Classification Match 9th-12th Canada; W 3–0	9th Place Match; Spain; W 3–0	9

== Basketball ==
=== 5×5 basketball ===
Summary

Team	Event	Group stage				Quarterfinal	Semifinal	Bronze medal match	
Team	Event	Opposition Score	Opposition Score	Opposition Score	Rank	Opposition Score	Opposition Score	Opposition Score	Rank
Germany men's	Men's tournament	Chinese Taipei; W 83–73	Finland; W 79–68	Chile; W 82–48	1 Q	Romania; W 78–62	Brazil; L 78–83	Bronze Medal Match; Lithuania; L 70–80	4
Germany women's	Women's tournament	United States; L 63–69	Poland; L 50–63	Chinese Taipei; W 81–40	3	Classification Match 9th-16th India; W 128–54	Classification Match 9th-12th Brazil; W 84–64	9th Place Match; Lithuania; W 79–63	9

Team rosters

Men

- Musa Abra
- Elias Baggette
- Jamal Entezami
- Sebastian Hartmann
- Lukas Herzog
- Tim Köpple
- Michael Rataj
- Leo Saffer
- Julian Steinfeld
- Nicholas Tischler
- Brandon Tischler

Women

- Skye Belker
- Merit Brennecke
- Nicole Brochlitz
- Emma Eichmeyer
- Lina Falk
- Elea Gaba
- Greta Kröger
- Martha Pietsch
- Nina Rosemeyer
- Jessika Schiffer
- Paula Wenemoser
- Franka Wittenberg

=== 3×3 basketball ===
Summary

Team	Event	Group stage			Play-in	Quarterfinal	Semifinal	Bronze medal match	
Team	Event	Opposition Score	Opposition Score	Rank	Opposition Score	Opposition Score	Opposition Score	Opposition Score	Rank
Germany men's	Men's tournament	India; W 21–6	Mongolia; L 13–21	2 PI	Chile; W 21–11	France; W 19–18	Lithuania; L 13–21	Bronze Medal Match; Czech Republic; L 17–21	4
Germany women's	Women's tournament	New Zealand; W 21–7	Italy; W 16–12	1 QF	—N/a	Hungary; W 21–11	Czech Republic; W 21–15	China; W 21–15	1st place, gold medalist(s)

Team rosters
Men

- Linus Beikame
- Vincent Hennen
- Carlo Meyer
- Lennart Schultz

Women

- Elisa Mevius
- Luisa Nufer
- Sarah Polleros
- Laura Zolper

=== 3×3 wheelchair basketball ===
Summary

Team	Event	Group stage				Quarterfinal	Semifinal	Bronze medal match	
Team	Event	Opposition Score	Opposition Score	Opposition Score	Rank	Opposition Score	Opposition Score	Opposition Score	Rank
Germany men's	Men's tournament	Spain; L 6–19	Bulgaria; W 17–3	Great Britain; L 8–9	3 QF	Japan; L 11–12	Did not advance		
Germany women's	Women's tournament	Spain; L 9–10	United States; W 9–6	Brazil; W 21–0	2	—N/a	United States; W 12–4	Spain; W 12–11	1st place, gold medalist(s)

Team rosters
Men

- Luis Conrad
- Thomas Reier
- Sören Seebold
- Luc Weilandt

Women

- Lisa Bergenthal
- Svenja Erni
- Lilly Sellak
- Catharina Weiß

== Diving ==
Men

Athlete	Event	Preliminary		Final	
Athlete	Event	Points	Rank	Points	Rank
Tim Axer	1 m springboard	299.35	11 Q	354.80	3rd place, bronze medalist(s)
Tim Axer	3 m springboard	376.95	10 Q	393.00	5
Lou Massenberg	3 m springboard	359.50	13	Did not advance	
Moritz Wesemann	3 m springboard	390.35	7 Q	454.20	1st place, gold medalist(s)
Tim Axer; Espen Prenzyna	3 m synchronized springboard	—N/a		354.99	4
Espen Prenzyna	10 m platform	372.60	6 Q	333.35	11
Tom Waldsteiner	10 m platform	322.40	14	Did not advance	
Luis Avila Sanchez; Jaden Eikermann	10 m synchronized platform	—N/a		400.74	2nd place, silver medalist(s)

Women

Athlete	Event	Preliminary		Final	
Athlete	Event	Points	Rank	Points	Rank
Lena Hentschel	3 m springboard	301.60	3 Q	265.75	3rd place, bronze medalist(s)
Jette Müller	3 m springboard	294.30	4 Q	265.55	4
Lena Hentschel; Jette Müller	3 m synchronized springboard	—N/a		263.10	3rd place, bronze medalist(s)
Carolina Coordes	10 m platform	270.60	6 Q	293.25	5
Pauline Pfeif	10 m platform	347.15	1 Q	354.40	3rd place, bronze medalist(s)
Carolina Coordes; Pauline Pfeif	10 m synchronized platform	—N/a		294.60	2nd place, silver medalist(s)

Mixed

Athlete	Event	Final	
Athlete	Event	Points	Rank
Luis Avila Sanchez; Lena Hentschel	3 m synchronized springboard	288.21	1st place, gold medalist(s)
Jaden Eikermann; Jette Müller; Pauline Pfeif; Moritz Wesemann	Team event	437.10	1st place, gold medalist(s)

== Fencing ==
Men

Athlete	Event	Group Stage		Round of 128	Round of 64	Round of 32	Round of 16	Quarterfinal	Semifinal	Final / BM	
Athlete	Event	Result	Rank	Opposition Score	Opposition Score	Opposition Score	Opposition Score	Opposition Score	Opposition Score	Opposition Score	Rank
Mika Ehringhaus	Épée	2–4	5	Geitung (NOR); L 14–15	Did not advance						
Julius Ruppenthal	Épée	2–4	4	Sauri (MEX); L 9–15	Did not advance						
Max Straub	Épée	5–1	1	Bye	Osman-Touson (HUN); L 12–15	Did not advance					
Michael Trebis	Épée	4–2	4	Bye	Salzer (CZE); W 15–11	Nakamoto (JPN); L 10–15	Did not advance				
Mika Ehringhaus; Julius Ruppenthal; Max Straub; Michael Trebis	Team épée	—N/a				South Africa; L 38–45	Did not advance				
Niklas Diestelkamp	Foil	6–0	1	—N/a	Bye	Stenbeck Schiavo (GBR); W 15–9	di Veroli (ITA); L 9–15	Did not advance			
Nils Fabinger	Foil	5–1	2	—N/a	Bye	Geudvert (BEL); L 6–15	Did not advance				
Jan Fritsche	Foil	3–2	2	—N/a	Helmy (FRA); L 9–15	Did not advance					
Moritz Renner	Foil	6–0	1	—N/a	Bye	Kwiatkowski (POL); W 15–8	Geudvert (BEL); L 13–15	Did not advance			
Niklas Diestelkamp; Nils Fabinger; Jan Fritsche; Moritz Renner	Team foil	—N/a				Bye	Netherlands; W 44–28	Poland; L 39–45	Classification Match 5th-8th Chinese Taipei; W 45–37	5th Place Match; Hungary; L 19–45	6
Jarl Kürbis	Sabre	2–4	6	Did not advance							
Max Müller	Sabre	2–4	5	—N/a	Seefeld (GER); W 15–13	Florez (ESP); L 14–15	Did not advance				
Moritz Schenkel	Sabre	6–0	1	—N/a	Bye	Vigh (HUN); W 15–13	Abzhal (KAZ); W 15–12	Park J-h (KOR); W 15–14	Park S-w (KOR); L 9–15	Did not advance	3rd place, bronze medalist(s)
Eric Seefeld	Sabre	4–2	1	—N/a	Müller (GER); L 13–15	Did not advance					
Jarl Kürbis; Max Müller; Moritz Schenkel; Eric Seefeld	Team sabre	—N/a				Bye	Turkey; W 45–43	South Korea; L 32–45	Classification Match 5th-8th Azerbaijan; W 45–26	5th Place Match; Poland; W 45–44	5

Women

Athlete	Event	Group Stage		Round of 128	Round of 64	Round of 32	Round of 16	Quarterfinal	Semifinal	Final / BM	
Athlete	Event	Result	Rank	Opposition Score	Opposition Score	Opposition Score	Opposition Score	Opposition Score	Opposition Score	Opposition Score	Rank
Lara Goldmann	Épée	3–3	2	Bye	Maksymenko (UKR); L 10–15	Did not advance					
Lisa Marie Löhr	Épée	5–1	3	Bye	Heubi (SUI); W 11–10	Maksymenko (UKR); L 12–15	Did not advance				
Luise Ziegler	Épée	5–0	1	Bye	Kim (KOR); L 8–9	Did not advance					
Alexandra Zittel	Épée	6–0	1	Bye	Izzo (SUI); W 12–11	Chaudhari (IND); W 15–11	Maksymenko (UKR); L 9–15	Did not advance			
Lara GoldmannLisa Marie Löhr; Luise Ziegler; Alexandra Zittel	Team épée	—N/a				Bye	India; W 45–21	Italy; L 34–45	Classification Match 5th-8th Hungary; L 36–45	7th Place Match; Japan; L 41–45	8
Marie Höfler	Foil	2–3	3	—N/a	Ku (MAC); W 15–3	Brugger-Brandauer (AUT); W 15–9	Kim (USA); L 6–15	Did not advance			
Celia Hohenadel	Foil	3–3	6	—N/a	Nekifor (HUN); L 14–15	Did not advance					
Anna Kothieringer	Foil	3–3	3	—N/a	Bye	Chan (HKG); W 15–8	Bonny (FRA); L 10–15	Did not advance			
Lara Witt	Foil	1–5	6	Did not advance							
Marie Höfler; Celia Hohenadel; Anna Kothieringer; Lara Witt	Team foil	—N/a					Spain; W 45–19	France; L 38–45	Classification Match 5th-8th United States; W 45–33	5th Place Match; Poland; W 45–37	5
Victoria Graudins	Sabre	2–3	4	—N/a	Fox (USA); L 11–15	Did not advance					
Maria Kurzawa	Sabre	3–3	5	—N/a	Aakhri (IND); L 14–15	Did not advance					
Lena Stemper	Sabre	3–3	4	—N/a	Khajuria (IND); W 15–5	Takahashi (JPN); L 13–15	Did not advance				
Christine Weber	Sabre	1–5	6	Did not advance							
Victoria Graudins; Maria Kurzawa; Lena Stemper; Christine Weber	Team sabre	—N/a					Turkey; L 42–45	Did not advance			

== Gymnastics ==
=== Artistic ===
Men
Team

Athlete	Event	Qualification						Final	
Athlete	Event	Apparatus						Total	Rank
Athlete	Event	F	PH	R	V	PB	HB	Total	Rank
Willi Binder	Team	12.333	9.333	11.933	13.433	12.333	12.633	71.998	37
Kilian Krapp	Team	12.333	—N/a		12.866	—N/a	11.833	—N/a	
Alexander Kunz	Team	12.866	12.866	13.066	13.500	12.766	13.466	78.530	11 Q
Niklas Neuhäusel	Team	13.633	11.033	11.700	13.233	12.500	11.433	73.532	31
Sascha Wilhelm	Team	—N/a	10.400	11.733	—N/a	12.033	—N/a		
Total	Team	38.832	34.299	36.732	40.166	37.599	37.932	225.560	15

Individual finals

Athlete	Event	Final							
Athlete	Event	Apparatus						Total	Rank
Athlete	Event	F	PH	R	V	PB	HB	Total	Rank
Alexander Kunz	All-around	13.166	11.333	13.033	13.100	12.900	13.466	76.998	12

Women
Team

Athlete	Event	Qualification				Final	
Athlete	Event	Apparatus				Total	Rank
Athlete	Event	V	UB	BB	F	Total	Rank
Elena Engelhardt	Team	11.850	10.500	12.200	10.750	45.300	52
Alina Heinemann	Team	12.250	11.350	12.100	11.900	47.600	39
Emma Malewski	Team	—N/a		13.400 Q	—N/a		
Nele Rüping	Team	—N/a					
Aiyu Zhu	Team	12.700	9.900	12.900	11.600	47.100	42
Total	Team	36.800	31.750	38.500	34.250	141.300	15

Individual finals

Athlete	Event	Apparatus				Total	Rank
Athlete	Event	V	UB	BB	F	Total	Rank
Emma Malewski	Balance beam	—N/a		13.166	—N/a	13.166	3rd place, bronze medalist(s)

=== Rhythmic ===
All-around

Athlete	Event	Hoop	Ball	Clubs	Ribbon	Total	Rank
Margarita Kolosov	Individual	23.400	26.700 Q	24.200	25.450	99.750	15
Anastasia Simakova	Individual	28.650 Q	27.800 Q	24.000	26.750 Q	107.200	4

Apparatus finals

Athlete	Event	Hoop	Ball	Clubs	Ribbon	Total	Rank
Margarita Kolosov	Ball	—N/a	28.200	—N/a		28.200	1st place, gold medalist(s)
Anastasia Simakova	Hoop	29.150	—N/a			29.150	2nd place, silver medalist(s)
Anastasia Simakova	Ball	—N/a	27.500	—N/a		27.500	3rd place, bronze medalist(s)
Anastasia Simakova	Ribbon	—N/a			26.500	26.500	4

== Judo ==
Men

Athlete	Event	Round of 64	Round of 32	Round of 16	Quarterfinals	Semifinals	Repechage	Final / BM	
Athlete	Event	Opposition Result	Opposition Result	Opposition Result	Opposition Result	Opposition Result	Opposition Result	Opposition Result	Rank
Nicolas Kutscher	–60 kg	—N/a	Chheav (CAM); W 100–000	Bakytzhan (KAZ); L 000–100	Did not advance				
David Ickes	–66 kg	Bye	Ayala (ECU); W 010–000	Naguchev (AIN); L 000–001	Did not advance				
Kevin Abeltshauser	–73 kg	—N/a	Kammoun (LBN); W 110–000	Tanaka (JPN); L 000–110	Did not advance				
Lennart Slamberger	–81 kg	—N/a	Silot (USA); L 000–100	Did not advance					
Lasse Enrique Schriever	–90 kg	—N/a	Musil (CZE); L 000–001	Did not advance					
Kilian Kappelmeier	–100 kg	—N/a	Amaro (ESP); W 010–000	Mataev (AIN); W 100–000	Baitas (KAZ); W 101–000	Kharazishvili (GEO); L 000–001	—N/a	Bronze Medal Bout; Sibișan (ROU); L 000–001	5
Marvin Belz	+100 kg	—N/a	Williams (USA); W 100–000	Diezma (ESP); W 020–000	Endovitskiy (AIN); L 000–100	Did not advance	Antoniou (CYP); L 000–001	Did not advance	

Women

Athlete	Event	Round of 32	Round of 16	Quarterfinals	Semifinals	Repechage	Final / BM	
Athlete	Event	Opposition Result	Opposition Result	Opposition Result	Opposition Result	Opposition Result	Opposition Result	Rank
Helen Habib	–48 kg	Tanimoto (USA); W 100–000	Aliyeva (AZE); W 100–010	Haydarova (UZB); L 002–102	Did not advance	Burkeyeva (KAZ); W 100–000	Bronze Medal Bout; Ertem (TUR); W 102–001	3rd place, bronze medalist(s)
Chiara Serra	–52 kg	Souza (BRA); L 000–100	Did not advance					
Laila Göbel	–57 kg	Gyertyas (HUN); L 000–100	Did not advance					
Viktoria Folger	–63 kg	Bye	Grabner (AUT); W 010–000	Fazliu (KOS); L 000–110	Did not advance	Varga (HUN); W 100–000	Bronze Medal Bout; Zachová (CZE); L 000–010	5
Samira Bock	–70 kg	Zárybnická (CZE); W 100–000	Gardashkhanli (AZE); W 100–000	Ögel (TUR); W 101–000	Vasconcelos (POR); W 100–000	—N/a	Maeda (JPN); L 000–100	2nd place, silver medalist(s)
Anna Monta Olek	–78 kg	Bye	Sugimura (JPN); W 100–000	Verschaere (BEL); W 010–000	Issoufi (FRA); W 100–001	—N/a	Freitas (BRA); W 020–000	1st place, gold medalist(s)

Mixed

Athlete	Event	Round of 32	Round of 16	Quarterfinals	Semifinals	Repechage	Final / BM	
Athlete	Event	Opposition Result	Opposition Result	Opposition Result	Opposition Result	Opposition Result	Opposition Result	Rank
Marvin Belz; Chiara Serra; Kevin Abeltshauser; Samira Bock; Lasse Enrique Schriever; Anna Monta Olek	Team	Bye	Kazakhstan; L 3–4	Did not advance				

== Rowing ==
Men

Athlete	Event	Heats		Quarterfinals		Semifinals		Final	
Athlete	Event	Time	Rank	Time	Rank	Time	Rank	Time	Rank
Jonas Gelsen	Single sculls	7:22.03	2 QF	7:43.15	1 SA/B	7:02.99	1 FA	7:41.54	5
Arno Gaus; Moritz Küpper	Double sculls	6:39.88	1 SA/B	—N/a		6:32.88	4 FB	6:51.04	7
Mark Hinrichs; Tom Tewes	Coxless pair	6:50.20	2 SA/B	—N/a		6:53.76	3 FA	7:08.77	5
Simon Haible; Nikita Mohr; Nils von Bülow; Jakob Waldheim	Coxless four	6:27.28	1 SA/B	—N/a		6:16.83	2 FA	6:31.32	5
Jasper Angl; Leonard Brahms; Julian Garth; Ben Gebauer; Mark Hinrichs; Julius Kaim; Till Martini; Jannik Metzger; Tom Tewes	Eight	5:55.53	1 FA	—N/a				5:58.76	4

Women

Athlete	Event	Heats		Quarterfinals		Semifinals		Final	
Athlete	Event	Time	Rank	Time	Rank	Time	Rank	Time	Rank
Alexandra Föster	Single sculls	7:58.44	1 QF	8:57.61	1 SA/B	7:52.51	1 FA	8:21.09	2nd place, silver medalist(s)
Andra Aumann; Malin von der Aue	Coxless pair	7:47.25	3 SA/B	—N/a		8:00.24	5 FB	7:42.67	9
Luise Bachmann; Olivia Clotten; Paula Hartmann; Lene Mührs	Coxless four	6:55.65	1 FA	—N/a				7:06.67	2nd place, silver medalist(s)
Luise Bachmann; Katharina Bauer; Olivia Clotten; Paula Gerundt; Judith Guhse; Paula Hartmann; Tabea Kuhnert; Lene Mührs; Florian Koch (cox)	Eight	6:40.46	2	—N/a				6:53.08	4

Mixed

Athlete	Event	Heats		Final	
Athlete	Event	Time	Rank	Time	Rank
Helena Brenke; Sydney Garbers; Oskar Kroglowski; Tjorven Schneider	Quadruple sculls	6:20.53	1 FA	6:40.12	2nd place, silver medalist(s)

== Swimming ==
Men

Athlete	Event	Heat		Semifinal		Final	
Athlete	Event	Time	Rank	Time	Rank	Time	Rank
Ole Mats Eidam	50 m freestyle	22.38	8 Q	22.42	10	Did not advance	
Moritz Schaller	50 m freestyle	22.68	14 Q	22.57	12	Did not advance	
Ole Mats Eidam	100 m freestyle	49.14	7 Q	49.06	8 Q	48.80	5
Moritz Schaller	100 m freestyle	50.31	34	Did not advance			
Philipp Peschke	200 m freestyle	1:49.30	12 Q	1:48.51	11	Did not advance	
Simon Reinke	400 m freestyle	3:54.11	12	—N/a		Did not advance	
Simon Reinke	800 m freestyle	8:03.45	7	—N/a		8:01.16	6
Simon Reinke	1500 m freestyle	15:29.96	9	—N/a		Did not advance	
Cornelius Jahn	50 m backstroke	25.73	15 Q	25.60	15	Did not advance	
Oskar Schildknecht	50 m backstroke	26.00	19	Did not advance			
Cornelius Jahn	100 m backstroke	54.87	10 Q	54.72	10	Did not advance	
Oskar Schildknecht	100 m backstroke	55.89	21	Did not advance			
Cornelius Jahn	200 m backstroke	2:02.55	20	Did not advance			
Oskar Schildknecht	200 m backstroke	DNS					
Jeremias Pock	50 m breaststroke	27.92	13 Q	27.53	3 Q	27.65	5
Jeremias Pock	100 m breaststroke	1:01.20	11 Q	1:01.36	14	Did not advance	
Jeremias Pock	200 m breaststroke	2:13.21	5 Q	2:12.26	9	Did not advance	
Ole Mats Eidam	50 m butterfly	23.33	1 Q	23.24	2 Q	23.55	4
Björn Kammann	50 m butterfly	23.53	3 Q	23.67	6 Q	23.68	7
Ole Mats Eidam	100 m butterfly	52.12	2 Q	52.03	2 Q	52.31	6
Björn Kammann	100 m butterfly	51.94	1 Q	52.24	5 Q	51.70	2nd place, silver medalist(s)
Björn Kammann	200 m butterfly	1:58.63	10 Q	1:58.60	13	Did not advance	
Jeremias Pock	200 m individual medley	2:00.35	5 Q	2:00.62	9	Did not advance	
Jeremias Pock	400 m individual medley	4:26.19	12	—N/a		Did not advance	
Moritz Schaller; Philipp Peschke; Ole Mats Eidam; Björn Kammann	4 × 100 m freestyle relay	3:17.76	4 Q	—N/a		3:16.07	6
Ole Mats Eidam; Cornelius Jahn; Björn Kammann; Moritz Schaller (heats); Jeremias Pock	4 × 100 m medley relay	3:37.44	2 Q	—N/a		3:36.47	6

Women

Athlete	Event	Heat		Semifinal		Final	
Athlete	Event	Time	Rank	Time	Rank	Time	Rank
Nicole Maier	100 m freestyle	55.98	12 Q	55.53	12	Did not advance	
Nicole Maier	200 m freestyle	2:00.17	3 Q	1:59.22	7 Q	1:58.76	6
Nicole Maier	400 m freestyle	4:19.84	20	—N/a		Did not advance	
Marian Plöger	400 m freestyle	4:20.36	21	—N/a		Did not advance	
Marian Plöger	800 m freestyle	8:41.71	10	—N/a		Did not advance	
Marian Plöger	1500 m freestyle	16:41.65	7 Q	—N/a		16:31.98	6
Kim Herkle	100 m breaststroke	1:11.25	20	Did not advance			
Kim Herkle	200 m breaststroke	2:29.22	2 Q	2:29.28	9	Did not advance	
Kim Herkle	200 m individual medley	2:17.03	13 Q	2:17.24	15	Did not advance	
Kim Herkle	400 m individual medley	4:49.01	9	—N/a		Did not advance	

Mixed

Athlete	Event	Heat		Final	
Athlete	Event	Time	Rank	Time	Rank
Cornelius Jahn; Björn Kammann; Kim Herkle; Nicole Maier	4 × 100 m medley relay	3:51.13	4 Q	3:51.13	6

== Table tennis ==
Men

Athlete	Event	Group stage			Round 1	Round 2	Round of 16	Quarterfinals	Semifinals	Final / BM	
Athlete	Event	Opposition Result	Opposition Result	Rank	Opposition Result	Opposition Result	Opposition Result	Opposition Result	Opposition Result	Opposition Result	Rank
Matthias Danzer	Singles	Ao (CHN); W 3–0	Koh (SGP); W 3–0	1	Kang (KOR); W 4–3	Yokotani (JPN); L 2–4	Did not advance				
Kirill Fadeev	Singles	zur Muhlen (NED); W 3–0	Jimenez (ECU); W 3–0	1	Araya (CRC); W 4–0	He (MAC); W 4–1	Toma (ROU); W 4–0	Grebnev (AIN); L 3–4	Did not advance		
Timotius Köchling	Singles	Tan (SGP); L 1–3	Kirby (IRL); W 3–0	2	Istrate (ROU); L 1–4	Did not advance					
Benno Oehme	Singles	—N/a			Tan (SGP); W 4–2	Michna (POL); L 2–4	Did not advance				
Matthias Danzer; Timotius Köchling	Doubles	—N/a			Gonzalez / Uribe (COL); W 3–1	Grela / Kolasa (POL); L 1–3	Did not advance				
Kirill Fadeev; Benno Oehme	Doubles	—N/a			Goldir / Zelinka (SVK); W 3–1	Win / Choi (AUS); W 3–0	Chua / Koh (SGP); L 0–3	Did not advance			
Matthias Danzer; Kirill Fadeev; Timotius Köchling; Benno Oehme	Team	Mongolia; W 3–0	Hungary; W 3–1	1 Q	—N/a		Singapore; W 3–0	Hong Kong; W 3–2	China; L 0–3	Did not advance	3rd place, bronze medalist(s)

Women

Athlete	Event	Group stage				Round 1	Round 2	Round of 16	Quarterfinals	Semifinals	Final / BM	
Athlete	Event	Opposition Result	Opposition Result	Opposition Result	Rank	Opposition Result	Opposition Result	Opposition Result	Opposition Result	Opposition Result	Opposition Result	Rank
Sophia Klee	Singles	Suwal (NEP); W 3–0	Picard (FRA); L 0–3	—N/a	2	Ng (HKG); L 0–4	Did not advance					
Lea Lachenmayer	Singles	Miyabara (BRA); W 3–1	Chiriacova (MDA); W 3–1	—N/a	1	Men (NED); W 4–3	Yang (CHN); L 1–4	Did not advance				
Franziska Schreiner	Singles	—N/a				Labosova (SVK); L 3–4	Did not advance					
Yuki Tsutsui	Singles	Kong (HKG); L 1–3	Sanmartin (ECU); W 3–1	—N/a	2	Wegrzyn (POL); L 0–4	Did not advance					
Sophia Klee; Franziska Schreiner	Doubles	—N/a				Bye	Lee / Lee (KOR); W 3–1	Sawettabut / Tayapitak (THA); L 1–3	Did not advance			
Lea Lachenmayer; Yuki Tsutsui	Doubles	—N/a				Cheung / Seak (MAC); W 3–0	Jorguseska / Men (NED); W 3–0	Han / Wang (CHN); L 0–3	Did not advance			
Sophia Klee; Lea Lachenmayer; Franziska Schreiner; Yuko Tsutsui	Team	Slovakia; W 3–1	Hungary; W 3–0	France; L 1–3	2 Q	—N/a		South Korea; W 3–2	Hong Kong; L 1–3	Did not advance		

Mixed

Athlete	Event	Round 1	Round 2	Round of 16	Quarterfinals	Semifinals	Final / BM	
Athlete	Event	Opposition Result	Opposition Result	Opposition Result	Opposition Result	Opposition Result	Opposition Result	Rank
Matthias Danzer; Sophia Klee	Doubles	Abdulhussein / Ali (QAT); W 3–2	Chan / Wong (HKG); L 0–3	Did not advance				
Benno Oehme; Franziska Schreiner	Doubles	Naresh / Tan (USA); L 1–3	Did not advance					

== Taekwondo ==
Men

Athlete	Event	Round of 32	Round of 16	Quarterfinals	Semifinals	Final	
Athlete	Event	Opposition Result	Opposition Result	Opposition Result	Opposition Result	Opposition Result	Rank
Takrim Mirza	–54 kg	Okwato (KEN); W 2–0	Kuru (TUR); L 0–2	Did not advance			
Jona Pörsch	–68 kg	Hajiyev (AZE); W 2–1	Stamenov (BUL); L 0–2	Did not advance			
Elia Pörsch	–74 kg	Ismayilzada (AZE); L 0–2	Did not advance				
Kaan Gümüs	–80 kg	Bye	Suleymanov (AZE); L 0–2	Did not advance			
Vincent Hörmann	–87 kg	Bye	Krpan (CRO); L 0–2	Did not advance			
Takrim MIrza; Vincent Hörmann; Elia Pörsch	Team kyorugi	Armenia; L 0–2	Did not advance				
Emir Can Erdemir	Individual poomsae	Bye	Mohd Soupie (SGP); W 8.766–8.632	—N/a		7.649	8
Emir Can Erdemir; Ken Levan Jordt; Fabian Reich	Team poomsae	—N/a				8.249	7

Women

Athlete	Event	Round of 32	Round of 16	Quarterfinals	Semifinals	Final	
Athlete	Event	Opposition Result	Opposition Result	Opposition Result	Opposition Result	Opposition Result	Rank
Helin Kodaman	–46 kg	Anika (IND); L 0–2	Did not advance				
Supharada Kisskalt	–49 kg	Bye	Tangirova (UZB); W 2–0	García (ESP); W 2–0	Sekeen (THA); W 2–1	Ma (CHN); L 0–2	2nd place, silver medalist(s)
Adiba Asimi	–53 kg	Guanga (ECU); L 0–2	Did not advance				
Jessica Wolf	–57 kg	El Hosseiny (EGY); W 2–0	Lisowska (POL); L 0–2	Did not advance			
Laura Göbel	–62 kg	Bye	Azizova (UZB); L 0–2	Did not advance			
Emily Hörmann	–73 kg	—N/a	Das (IND); W 2–0	Oliveira (BRA); L 0–2	Did not advance		
Esmeralda Husovic	+73 kg	Bye	Chin (TPE); L 0–1	Did not advance			
Jessica Wolf; Emily Hörmann; Helin Kodaman	Team kyorugi	Bye	Kazakhstan; L 0–2	Did not advance			
Adina Machwirth	Individual poomsae	Arellano (MEX); W 8.682–8.449	De Almeida (POR); W 8.933–8.799	—N/a		7.633	7
Leah Lawall; Adina Machwirth; Anna Siepmann	Team poomsae	—N/a	Singapore; W 8.399–8.316	—N/a		8.366	3rd place, bronze medalist(s)

Mixed

Athlete	Event	Round of 32	Round of 16	Quarterfinals	Semifinals	Final	
Athlete	Event	Opposition Result	Opposition Result	Opposition Result	Opposition Result	Opposition Result	Rank
Laura Göbel; Kaan Gümüs; Jona Pörsch; Supharada Kisskalt	Team kyorugi	Bye	Turkey; W 2–1	India; W 2–0	Uzbekistan; L 0–2	Did not advance	3rd place, bronze medalist(s)
Rebecca Hartok; Fabian Reich	Pair poomsae	France; L 8.066–8.282	Did not advance				

== Tennis ==
Men

Athlete	Event	Round of 64	Round of 32	Round of 16	Quarterfinals	Semifinals	Final / BM	
Athlete	Event	Opposition Score	Opposition Score	Opposition Score	Opposition Score	Opposition Score	Opposition Score	Rank
Nino Toto	Singles	Milushev (UZB); L 5–7, 6–4, 3–6	Consolation Round; Idrovo (ECU); W 6–4, 6–3	Consolation Round; Jin (AUS); L 0–6, 4–6	Did not advance			
Alessio Vasquez	Singles	Fogle (RSA); W 6–1, 6–2	Alkaya (TUR); W 6–2, 3–6, 7–6	Taka (JPN); W 6–4, 6–1	Dietrich (SUI); W 7–5, 1–6, 6–4	Samuel (GBR); L 6–7, 3–6	Did not advance	3rd place, bronze medalist(s)
Finn Bischof; Alessio Vasquez	Doubles	—N/a	Connel / Dhokia (GBR); W 5–7, 7–6, [10–7]	Hans / Kesharwani (IND); W 6–4, 5–7, [13–11]	Gabelic / Slavic (SWE); L 2–6, 3–6	Did not advance		

Women

Athlete	Event	Round of 64	Round of 32	Round of 16	Quarterfinals	Semifinals	Final / BM	
Athlete	Event	Opposition Score	Opposition Score	Opposition Score	Opposition Score	Opposition Score	Opposition Score	Rank
Gina Marie Dittmann	Singles	Kleinhans (RSA); W 6–1, 6–1	Lin (TPE); W 2–6, 6–3, 6–3	Kucmova (CZE); W 6–2, 6–4	Otzipka (BEL); L 4–6, 3–6	Did not advance		
Sina Herrmann	Singles	Millas (CHI); W 6–1, 6–0	Biot (BEL); W 7–6, 1–0 Retired	Yao (CHN); W 7–6, 6–3	Adkar (IND); L 1–6, 4–6	Did not advance		
Anastasia Simonov	Singles	Bye	Consolation Round; Taylor (AUS); W 6–4, 6–2	Consolation Round; Luscher (SUI); L 6–1, 5–7, [13–15]	Did not advance			
Gina Marie Dittmann; Sina Herrmann	Doubles	—N/a	Lozano / Millas (CHI); W 6–0, 6–0	Ronde / Choudhury (IND); W 6–1, 6–1	Li / Lin (TPE); L 5–7, 4–6	Did not advance		

Mixed

Athlete	Event	Round of 32	Round of 16	Quarterfinals	Semifinals	Final / BM	
Athlete	Event	Opposition Score	Opposition Score	Opposition Score	Opposition Score	Opposition Score	Rank
Anastasia Simonov; Nino Toto	Doubles	Lee / Lo (TPE); L 6–4, 6–7, [7–10]	Did not advance				

== Volleyball ==
=== Beach ===
Athletes	Event	Preliminary round				Lucky Loser	Round of 16	Quarterfinal	Semifinal	Final	
Athletes	Event	Opposition Score	Opposition Score	Opposition Score	Rank	Opposition Score	Opposition Score	Opposition Score	Opposition Score	Opposition Score	Rank
Philipp Huster; Max Just	Men's	Alb / Muresan (ROU); W 2–0 (21–14, 21–8)	Iglesias / Negrete (CHI); W 2–0 (21–15, 21–13)	Basey / Hurst (USA); W 2–1 (21–19, 19–21, 15–11)	1 Q	—N/a	Klemen / Sponer (AUT); W 2–0 (21–15, 21–17)	Cumakas / Palubinskas (LTU); W 2–0 (21–16, 21–17)	Iervolino / Mancini (ITA); W 2–1 (19–21, 21–18, 15–12)	Groenewold / Sonneville (NED); W 2–0 (21–13, 21–12)	1st place, gold medalist(s)
Lea Sophie Kunst; Melanie Paul	Women's	Cheiykho / Lynn (LBN); W 2–0 (21–1, 21–11)	Derkintyte / Lindqvist (SWE); W 2–0 (21–19, 21–12)	Hogenhout / Negenmann (NED); L 1–2 (21–9, 18–21, 12–15)	2 Q	—N/a	Rabitsch / Trailovic (AUT); W 2–0 (21–16, 21–17)	Hogenhout / Negenmann (NED); L 0–2 (20–22, 16–21)	Did not advance		

=== Indoor ===
Summary

Team	Event	Group stage				Quarterfinal	Semifinal	Final / BM	
Team	Event	Opposition Score	Opposition Score	Opposition Score	Rank	Opposition Score	Opposition Score	Opposition Score	Rank
Germany men's	Men's tournament	United States; W 3–0	Italy; L 0–3	South Korea; W 3–0	2 Q	Japan; L 0–3	Classification 5th-8th Chinese Taipei; L 1–3	7th Place Match; Colombia; W 3–0	7
Germany women's	Women's tournament	Argentina; W 3–0	Mongolia; W 3–0	China; W 3–0	1 Q	Poland; W 3–1	Italy; L 0–3	Bronze Medal Match; Brazil; L 1–3	4

== Water polo ==
Summary

Team	Event	Group stage				Quarterfinal	Semifinal	Final / BM	
Team	Event	Opposition Score	Opposition Score	Opposition Score	Rank	Opposition Score	Opposition Score	Opposition Score	Rank
Germany men's	Men's tournament	New Zealand; W 21–6	United States; W 13–9	Hungary; L 13–15	2	South Korea; W 30–7	Italy; L 14–17	Bronze Medal Match; Hungary; W 21–20	3rd place, bronze medalist(s)
Germany women's	Women's tournament	Australia; L 9–10	Hungary; L 6–14	Turkey; W 24–5	3	Japan; W 13–11	New Zealand; W 9–8	United States; W 9–6	1st place, gold medalist(s)
