= Rowing at the 2025 Summer World University Games – Men's double sculls =

Men's double sculls at the 2025 Summer World University Games
- Venue: Regattabahn Duisburg
- Location: Duisburg
- Dates: 25 July (heats); 26 July (semifinals); 27 July (finals A―D)
- Competitors: 46 from 23 nations

Medalists
gold medal	Nicolaas Dirkzwager; Adam Street	Netherlands
silver medal	Goran Mahmutović; Karlo Borković	Croatia
bronze medal	Edoardo Rocchi; Andrea Pazzagli	Italy

The men's double sculls at the 2025 Summer World University Games in Rhine-Ruhr, Germany was held from 25 to 27 July 2025. Nicolaas Dirkzwager and Adam Street from Netherlands won the gold medals, Goran Mahmutović and Karlo Borković from Croatia earned the silver medals and Edoardo Rocchi and Andrea Pazzagli from Italy took the bronze medals.

== Schedule ==
All times are Central European Time (UTC+1)

Date	Time	Round
25 July 2025	11:50	Heats
26 July 2025	9:42	Semifinals
27 July 2025	9:42	Final D
27 July 2025	9:50	Final C
27 July 2025	9:58	Final B
27 July 2025	12:10	Final A

== Results ==
=== Heats ===
The two fastest boats in each heat and the four fastest times advanced directly to the semifinals. The next six fastest times advanced to the Final C. The remaining boats were sent to the final D.

==== Heat 1 ====
Rank	Rowers	Country	Time	Notes
1	(b) Nicolaas Dirkzwager (s) Adam Street	Netherlands	6:41.26	Q
2	(b) Kota Nakashima (s) Taisei Miyaguchi	Japan	6:45.75	Q
3	(b) Albin Delacommune (s) Maël Aït Khelifa Mallet	France	6:49.91	Q
4	(b) Sergi Olid (s) Jordi Alexandrescu	Spain	6:50.69	FC
5	(b) Marcell Zudor (s) István Althammer	Hungary	7:14.28	FD
6	(b) Yevhenii Kuleba (s) Yukhym Patlaienko	Ukraine	7:16.78	FD

==== Heat 2 ====
Rank	Rowers	Country	Time	Notes
1	(b) Edoardo Rocchi (s) Andrea Pazzagli	Italy	6:44.41	Q
2	(b) Calvin Pally (s) Keithan Woodhouse	Canada	6:48.28	Q
3	(b) Stefan Breytenbach (s) Ryan Dellbridge	South Africa	6:50.04	FC
4	(b) Jan Chlebovský (s) Adam Šnajdr	Czech Republic	6:52.12	FC
5	(b) Kim Do-yoon (s) Chung Min-woo	South Korea	7:16.93	FD
6	(b) Harvinder Cheema (s) Bhupinder Singh	India	7:20.70	FD

==== Heat 3 ====
Rank	Rowers	Country	Time	Notes
1	(b) Moritz Küpper (s) Arno Gaus	Germany	6:39.88	Q
2	(b) Benas Paunksnis (s) Saulius Aušbikavičius	Lithuania	6:42.06	Q
3	(b) Goran Mahmutović (s) Karlo Borković	Croatia	6:46.10	Q
4	(b) Adam Bujnowski (s) Gustaw Skarżyński	Poland	6:48.78	Q
5	(b) Matthew O'Meara (s) Henry Clatworthy	New Zealand	6:55.03	FC
6	(b) Baturalp Akdeniz (s) Giray Yazçayır	Turkey	6:58.90	FC

==== Heat 4 ====
Rank	Rowers	Country	Time	Notes
1	(b) Alexandr Bulat (s) Mihail Iudin	Moldova	6:44.32	Q
2	(b) Erik Vaktskjold (s) Fredrik Reite	Norway	6:46.94	Q
3	(b) Michal Karlovsky (s) Fabian Gillhofer	Austria	6:49.51	Q
4	(b) Bapan Askhanbek (s) Alexey Krasnovskiy	Kazakhstan	7:12.74	FC
5	(b) Bruno Amer (s) German Amer	Argentina	7:18.65	FD

=== Semifinals ===
The three fastest boats in each heat advanced directly to the final A. The remaining boats were sent to the final B.

==== Semifinal 1 ====
Rank	Rowers	Country	Time	Notes
1	(b) Edoardo Rocchi (s) Andrea Pazzagli	Italy	6:31.97	Q
2	(b) Goran Mahmutović (s) Karlo Borković	Croatia	6:32.28	Q
3	(b) Benas Paunksnis (s) Saulius Aušbikavičius	Lithuania	6:32.80	Q
4	(b) Arno Gaus (s) Moritz Küpper	Germany	6:32.88	FB
5	(b) Maël Aït Khelifa Mallet (s) Albin Delacommune	France	6:41.44	FB
6	(b) Calvin Pally (s) Keithan Woodhouse	Canada	6:49.72	FB

==== Semifinal 2 ====
Rank	Rowers	Country	Time	Notes
1	(b) Nicolaas Dirkzwager (s) Adam Street	Netherlands	6:35.26	Q
2	(b) Kota Nakashima (s) Taisei Miyaguchi	Japan	6:40.82	Q
3	(b) Mihail Iudin (s) Alexandr Bulat	Moldova	6:41.78	Q
4	(b) Erik Vaktskjold (s) Fredrik Reite	Norway	6:47.24	FB
5	(b) Adam Bujnowski (s) Gustaw Skarżyński	Poland	6:48.17	FB
6	(b) Michal Karlovsky (s) Fabian Gillhofer	Austria	7:07.21	FB

=== Finals ===
The A final determined the rankings for places 1 to 6. Additional rankings were determined in the other finals.

==== Final D ====
Rank	Rowers	Country	Time	Total rank
1	(b) Marcell Zudor (s) István Althammer	Hungary	7:14.13	19
2	(b) Kim Do-yoon (s) Chung Min-woo	South Korea	7:14.36	20
3	(b) Harvinder Cheema (s) Bhupinder Singh	India	7:23.03	21
4	(b) Yukhym Patlaienko (s) Yevhenii Kuleba	Ukraine	7:24.54	22
5	(b) Bruno Amer (s) German Amer	Argentina	7:25.70	23

==== Final C ====
Rank	Rowers	Country	Time	Total rank
1	(b) Sergi Olid (s) Jordi Alexandrescu	Spain	6:57.26	13
2	(b) Adam Šnajdr (s) Jan Chlebovský	Czech Republic	7:01.58	14
3	(b) Baturalp Akdeniz (s) Giray Yazçayır	Turkey	7:02.35	15
4	(b) Matthew O'Meara (s) Henry Clatworthy	New Zealand	7:05.05	16
5	(b) Bapan Askhanbek (s) Alexey Krasnovskiy	Kazakhstan	7:06.81	17
6	(b) Stefan Breytenbach (s) Ryan Dellbridge	South Africa	7:12.78	18

==== Final B ====
Rank	Rowers	Country	Time	Total rank
1	(b) Arno Gaus (s) Moritz Küpper	Germany	6:51.04	7
2	(b) Maël Aït Khelifa Mallet (s) Albin Delacommune	France	6:59.50	8
3	(b) Calvin Pally (s) Keithan Woodhouse	Canada	7:01.04	9
4	(b) Michal Karlovsky (s) Fabian Gillhofer	Austria	7:02.55	10
5	(b) Adam Bujnowski (s) Gustaw Skarżyński	Poland	7:03.30	11
6	(b) Erik Vaktskjold (s) Fredrik Reite	Norway	7:05.79	12

==== Final A ====
Rank	Rowers	Country	Time	Notes
1st place, gold medalist(s)	(b) Nicolaas Dirkzwager (s) Adam Street	Netherlands	6:42.65	
2nd place, silver medalist(s)	(b) Goran Mahmutović (s) Karlo Borković	Croatia	6:44.23	
3rd place, bronze medalist(s)	(b) Edoardo Rocchi (s) Andrea Pazzagli	Italy	6:44.72	
4	(b) Benas Paunksnis (s) Saulius Aušbikavičius	Lithuania	6:45.48	
5	(b) Mihail Iudin (s) Alexandr Bulat	Moldova	6:47.06	
6	(b) Kota Nakashima (s) Taisei Miyaguchi	Japan	6:50.55	
