= Swimming at the 2025 Summer World University Games – Women's 200 metre breaststroke =

Women's 200 metre breaststroke at the 2025 Summer World University Games
- Venue: Schwimm- und Sprunghalle im Europasportpark
- Location: Berlin
- Dates: 20 July (heats and semifinals); 21 July (final)
- Competitors: 38 from 26 nations

Medalists
gold medal	Yumeno Kusuda	Japan
silver medal	Yuyumi Obatake	Japan
bronze medal	Aina González	Spain

The women's 200 metre breaststroke at the 2025 Summer World University Games in Rhine-Ruhr, Germany was held from 20 to 21 July 2025. Yumeno Kusuda from Japan won the gold medal, Yuyumi Obatake from Japan took the silver medal and Aina González from Spain earned the bronze medal.

== Schedule ==
All times are Central European Time (UTC+1)

Date	Time	Round
20 July	10:38	Heats
20 July	20:32	Semifinals
21 July	20:52	Final

== Records ==
Prior to the competition, the world and Universiade records were as follows.

Category	Swimmer	Record	Date	Place	Event
World record	(Russia) Evgeniia Chikunova	2:17.55	21 April 2023	Kazan, Russia	2023 Russian Championships
Universiade record	(Japan) Rie Kaneto	2:22.32	9 July 2009	Belgrade, Serbia	2009 Summer Universiade

== Results ==
=== Heats ===
All entered athletes competed across multiple seeded heats in the morning session. Swimmers with the top 16 fastest times advanced, regardless of which individual heat they swam.

Rank	Heat	Lane	Swimmer	Nation	Time	Notes
1	5	4	Yumeno Kusuda	Japan	2:28.37	Q
2	5	6	Kim Herkle	Germany	2:29.22	Q
3	3	5	Yuyumi Obatake	Japan	2:29.32	Q
4	4	4	Katie Christopherson	United States	2:29.55	Q
5	4	3	Francesca Zucca	Italy	2:29.57	Q
6	5	3	Anna Pirovano	Italy	2:29.88	Q
7	5	5	Abigail Herscu	United States	2:29.96	Q
8	5	7	Simone Moll	South Africa	2:30.10	Q
9	3	3	Aliz Kalmár	Hungary	2:30.33	Q
10	3	2	Maria Erokhina	Cyprus	2:30.65	Q
11	4	2	Sára Bozsó	Hungary	2:30.69	Q
12	4	5	Aina Fernández	Spain	2:30.84	Q
13	4	6	Lisa Nystrand	Sweden	2:30.94	Q
14	3	4	Anna Morgan	Great Britain	2:31.41	Q
15	5	8	Kate Meyer	South Africa	2:31.76	Q
16	5	2	Martina Barbeito	Argentina	2:31.95	Q
17	3	6	Hazal Özkan	Turkey	2:32.26	
18	3	1	Jenna Pulkkinen	Finland	2:32.65	
19	4	1	Nina Vadovičová	Slovakia	2:34.50	
20	2	4	Elle Tay	Singapore	2:34.70	
21	3	7	Moa Bergdahl	Sweden	2:35.11	
22	4	8	Anastasia Basisto	Moldova	2:35.46	
23	2	5	Melanie Chong	Singapore	2:35.55	
24	5	1	Yun Eun-sol	South Korea	2:36.02	
25	3	8	Kyla Brown	Australia	2:36.24	
26	4	7	Lam Hoi Kiu	Hong Kong	2:36.87	
27	2	3	Sara Mihalič	Slovenia	2:39.75	
28	2	6	Antonia Cubillos	Chile	2:41.80	
29	2	7	Divyanka Pradhan	India	2:47.68	
30	2	2	Marie Toompuu	Estonia	2:47.75	
31	1	7	Anniina Murto	Finland	2:48.65	
32	1	4	Hanna-Marleen Mõtsnik	Estonia	2:49.77	
33	2	1	Marija Goberga	Latvia	2:50.87	
34	2	8	Anushka Patil	India	2:55.01	
35	1	3	Karen Barros	Ecuador	2:55.38	
36	1	2	Mia Martinicorena	Argentina	2:58.08	
37	1	6	Dayanna Barreto	Ecuador	3:04.86	
38	1	5	Edith Camacho	Mexico	3:05.69	

=== Semifinals ===
The 16 advancing swimmers were split into two semifinal heats of 8 during the evening session. The swimmers recording the top 8 fastest times advanced to the final round.

Rank	Heat	Lane	Swimmer	Nation	Time	Notes
1	2	4	Yumeno Kusuda	Japan	2:27.35	Q
2	2	2	Aliz Kalmár	Hungary	2:27.74	Q
3	1	7	Aina Fernández	Spain	2:27.93	Q
4	2	3	Francesca Zucca	Italy	2:28.16	Q
5	1	3	Anna Pirovano	Italy	2:28.78	Q
6	2	5	Yuyumi Obatake	Japan	2:28.90	Q
7	2	1	Lisa Nystrand	Sweden	2:28.97	Q
8	1	5	Katie Christopherson	United States	2:29.04	Q
9	1	4	Kim Herkle	Germany	2:29.28	
10	1	6	Simone Moll	South Africa	2:29.42	
11	2	6	Abigail Herscu	United States	2:29.43	
12	1	1	Anna Morgan	Great Britain	2:29.90	
13	2	7	Sára Bozsó	Hungary	2:30.73	
14	2	8	Kate Meyer	South Africa	2:31.45	
15	1	2	Maria Erokhina	Cyprus	2:31.46	
16	1	8	Martina Barbeito	Argentina	2:35.29	

=== Final ===
The fastest 8 swimmers competed in a single race to determine the gold, silver and bronze medalists.

Rank	Lane	Swimmer	Nation	Time	Notes
1st place, gold medalist(s)	4	Yumeno Kusuda	Japan	2:26.15	
2nd place, silver medalist(s)	7	Yuyumi Obatake	Japan	2:28.17	
3rd place, bronze medalist(s)	3	Aina Fernández	Spain	2:28.48	
4	5	Aliz Kalmár	Hungary	2:28.82	
5	8	Katie Christopherson	United States	2:29.55	
6	6	Francesca Zucca	Italy	2:29.56	
7	1	Lisa Nystrand	Sweden	2:30.49	
8	2	Anna Pirovano	Italy	2:34.27	
