= Rowing at the 2025 Summer World University Games – Women's coxless pair =

Women's coxless pair at the 2025 Summer World University Games
- Venue: Regattabahn Duisburg
- Location: Duisburg
- Dates: 25 July (heats); 26 July (semifinals and final B); 27 July (final A)
- Competitors: 26 from 13 nations

Medalists
gold medal	Ugnė Juzėnaitė; Kamilė Kralikaitė	Lithuania
silver medal	Courtney Westley; Katherine Williams	South Africa
bronze medal	Frances Casey; Isobel Eliadis-Watson	New Zealand

The women's coxless pair at the 2025 Summer World University Games in Rhine-Ruhr, Germany was held from 25 to 27 July 2025. Ugnė Juzėnaitė and Kamilė Kralikaitė from Lithuania won the gold medals, Courtney Westley and Katherine Williams from South Africa earned the silver medals and Frances Casey and Isobel Eliadis-Watson from New Zealand took the bronze medals.

== Schedule ==
All times are Central European Time (UTC+1)

Date	Time	Round
25 July 2025	9:18	Heats
26 July 2025	9:18	Semifinals
26 July 2025	13:08	Final B
27 July 2025	11:10	Final A

== Results ==
=== Heats ===
The two fastest boats in each heat and the six fastest times advanced directly to the semifinals. The remaining boats were eliminated.

==== Heat 1 ====
Rank	Rowers	Country	Time	Notes
1	(b) Weronika Ludwiczak (s) Anna Potrzuska	Poland	7:40.19	Q
2	(b) Emma Eckschlager (s) Flora Populorum	Austria	7:43.81	Q
3	(b) Malin von der Aue (s) Andra Aumann	Germany	7:47.25	Q
4	(b) Mallory Sullivan (s) Anna Venditti	United States	7:48.90	Q
5	(b) Lokupathirage Perera (s) Kalpani Aleththuge	Sri Lanka	9:58.72	

==== Heat 2 ====
Rank	Rowers	Country	Time	Notes
1	(b) Ugnė Juzėnaitė (s) Kamilė Kralikaitė	Lithuania	7:22.42	Q
2	(b) Frances Casey (s) Isobel Eliadis-Watson	New Zealand	7:30.91	Q
3	(b) Sona Hospers (s) Noortje Wilms	Netherlands	7:32.96	Q
4	(b) Lauren Carey (s) Angharad Broughton	Great Britain	7:35.94	Q

==== Heat 3 ====
Rank	Rowers	Country	Time	Notes
1	(b) Katherine Williams (s) Courtney Westley	South Africa	7:29.97	Q
2	(b) Samantha Premerl (s) Vittoria Calabrese	Italy	7:44.97	Q
3	(b) Alžběta Zavadilová (s) Barbora Podrazilová	Czech Republic	7:51.64	Q
4	(b) Lola Goessens (s) Clara Bresson	France	7:56.29	Q

=== Semifinals ===
The three fastest boats in each heat advanced directly to the final A. The remaining boats were sent to the final B.

==== Semifinal 1 ====
Rank	Rowers	Country	Time	Notes
1	(b) Ugnė Juzėnaitė (s) Kamilė Kralikaitė	Lithuania	7:24.68	Q
2	(b) Frances Casey (s) Isobel Eliadis-Watson	New Zealand	7:37.30	Q
3	(b) Angharad Broughton (s) Lauren Carey	Great Britain	7:41.12	Q
4	(b) Lola Goessens (s) Clara Bresson	France	7:52.65	FB
5	(b) Malin von der Aue (s) Andra Aumann	Germany	8:00.24	FB
6	(b) Emma Eckschlager (s) Flora Populorum	Austria	8:05.43	FB

==== Semifinal 2 ====
Rank	Rowers	Country	Time	Notes
1	(b) Courtney Westley (s) Katherine Williams	South Africa	7:30.74	Q
2	(b) Sona Hospers (s) Noortje Wilms	Netherlands	7:34.27	Q
3	(b) Weronika Ludwiczak (s) Anna Potrzuska	Poland	7:41.82	Q
4	(b) Vittoria Calabrese (s) Samantha Premerl	Italy	7:45.48	FB
5	(b) Alžběta Zavadilová (s) Barbora Podrazilová	Czech Republic	7:55.63	FB
6	(b) Mallory Sullivan (s) Anna Venditti	United States	7:57.80	FB

=== Finals ===
The A final determined the rankings for places 1 to 6. Additional rankings were determined in the other finals.

==== Final B ====
Rank	Rowers	Country	Time	Total rank
1	(b) Vittoria Calabrese (s) Samantha Premerl	Italy	7:36.52	7
2	(b) Alžběta Zavadilová (s) Barbora Podrazilová	Czech Republic	7:41.09	8
3	(b) Malin von der Aue (s) Andra Aumann	Germany	7:42.67	9
4	(b) Emma Eckschlager (s) Flora Populorum	Austria	7:44.64	10
5	(b) Mallory Sullivan (s) Anna Venditti	United States	7:45.23	11
6	(b) Lola Goessens (s) Clara Bresson	France	7:48.09	12

==== Final A ====
Rank	Rowers	Country	Time	Notes
1st place, gold medalist(s)	(b) Ugnė Juzėnaitė (s) Kamilė Kralikaitė	Lithuania	7:42.96	
2nd place, silver medalist(s)	(b) Courtney Westley (s) Katherine Williams	South Africa	7:43.97	
3rd place, bronze medalist(s)	(b) Frances Casey (s) Isobel Eliadis-Watson	New Zealand	7:55.61	
4	(b) Weronika Ludwiczak (s) Anna Potrzuska	Poland	7:59.86	
5	(b) Angharad Broughton (s) Lauren Carey	Great Britain	8:02.24	
6	(b) Sona Hospers (s) Noortje Wilms	Netherlands	8:06.67	
