= Rowing at the 2025 Summer World University Games – Mixed quadruple sculls =

Mixed quadruple sculls at the 2025 Summer World University Games
- Venue: Regattabahn Duisburg
- Location: Duisburg
- Dates: 25 July (heats); 27 July (finals B―A)
- Competitors: 44 from 11 nations

Medalists
gold medal	Martina Fanfani; Tommaso Vianello; Lorenzo Baldo; Alice Ramella	Italy
silver medal	Tjorven Schneider; Oskar Kroglowski; Sydney Grabers; Helena Brenke	Germany
bronze medal	Ugnė Šakickaitė; Agnė Kubaitytė; Rokas Jakubauskas; Justas Kuskevičius	Lithuania

The mixed quadruple sculls at the 2025 Summer World University Games in Rhine-Ruhr, Germany was held from 25 to 27 July 2025. Italy won the gold medal, Great Britain earned the silver medal and Lithuania took the bronze medal.

== Schedule ==
All times are Central European Time (UTC+1)

Date	Time	Round
25 July 2025	8:30	Heats
27 July 2025	8:30	Final B
27 July 2025	13:34	Final A

== Results ==
=== Heats ===
The two fastest boats in each heat and the two fastest times advanced directly to the final A. The remaining boats were sent to the final B.

==== Heat 1 ====
Rank	Rowers	Country	Time	Notes
1	(b) Helena Brenke (2) Sydney Garbers (3) Tjorven Schneider (s) Oskar Kroglowski	Germany	6:20.53	Q
2	(b) Tommaso Vianello (2) Alice Ramella (3) Martina Fanfani (s) Lorenzo Baldo	Italy	6:25.99	Q
3	(b) Jirakit Phuetthonglang (2) Siripong Chaiwichitchonkul (3) Phasin Chueatai (s) Natticha Kaewhom	Thailand	6:37.35	Q
4	(b) Lin Hsuan-yun (2) Wang Chen-yue (3) Li Ji-hong (s) Yu Pei-fen	Chinese Taipei	6:45.77	FB
5	(b) Song Jae-young (2) Seong Ju-yeong (3) Lee Su-yeon (s) Choi Yoon-sung	South Korea	6:47.72	FB
6	(b) Rohit Bedwal (2) Pavitra (3) Rushikesh Shelke (s) Diksha	India	6:52.78	FB

==== Heat 2 ====
Rank	Rowers	Country	Time	Notes
1	(b) Agnė Kubaitytė (2) Justas Kuskevičius (3) Ugnė Šakickaitė (s) Rokas Jakubauskas	Lithuania	6:26.24	Q
2	(b) Lea Farac (2) Goran Mahmutović (3) Nina Farac (s) Karlo Borković	Croatia	6:31.98	Q
3	(b) Viktória Harsányi (2) Balázs Szöllősi (3) Janka Zsiros (s) Keve Kertész	Hungary	6:34.41	Q
4	(b) Sarah Harper (2) Kathryn Zaloom (3) Joseph Yeager (s) Jayden Dasher	United States	6:42.24	FB
5	(b) Karyna Karpenko (2) Oleksandr Kulykov (3) Valeriia Kultenko (s) Bohdan Melnyk	Ukraine	6:50.68	FB

=== Finals ===
The A final determined the rankings for places 1 to 6. Additional rankings were determined in the other finals.

==== Final B ====
Rank	Rowers	Country	Time	Total rank
1	(b) Sarah Harper (2) Kathryn Zaloom (3) Joseph Yeager (s) Jayden Dasher	United States	6:59.68	7
2	(b) Lin Hsuan-yun (2) Li Ji-hong (3) Wang Chen-yue (s) Yu Pei-fen	Chinese Taipei	7:01.40	8
3	(b) Rushikesh Shelke (2) Diksha (3) Rohit Bedwal (s) Pavitra	India	7:03.81	9
4	(b) Seong Ju-yeong (2) Lee Su-yeon (3) Choi Yoon-sung (s) Song Jae-young	South Korea	7:07.77	10
5	(b) Valeriia Kultenko (2) Bohdan Melnyk (3) Karyna Karpenko (s) Oleksandr Kulykov	Ukraine	7:20.72	11

==== Final A ====
Rank	Rowers	Country	Time	Notes
1st place, gold medalist(s)	(b) Martina Fanfani (2) Tommaso Vianello (3) Lorenzo Baldo (s) Alice Ramella	Italy	6:38.39	
2nd place, silver medalist(s)	(b) Tjorven Schneider (2) Oskar Kroglowski (3) Sydney Garbers (s) Helena Brenke	Germany	6:40.12	
3rd place, bronze medalist(s)	(b) Ugnė Šakickaitė (2) Agnė Kubaitytė (3) Rokas Jakubauskas (s) Justas Kuskevičius	Lithuania	6:46.41	
4	(b) Viktória Harsányi (2) Balázs Szöllősi (3) Janka Zsiros (s) Keve Kertész	Hungary	6:48.25	
5	(b) Lea Farac (2) Nina Farac (3) Goran Mahmutović (s) Karlo Borković	Croatia	7:03.79	
6	(b) Jirakit Phuetthonglang (2) Natticha Kaewhom (3) Phasin Chueatai (s) Siripong Chaiwichitchonkul	Thailand	7:05.76	
