= Athletics at the 2025 Summer World University Games – Women's discus throw =

Women's discus throw at the 2025 Summer World University Games
- Venue: Lohrheidestadion
- Location: Bochum, Germany
- Dates: 23 July (qualification); 24 July (final)
- Competitors: 20 from 14 nations
- Winning distance: 61.15 m SB

Medalists
| gold medal | Özlem Becerek | Turkey |
| silver medal | Caisa-Marie Lindfors | Sweden |
| bronze medal | Antonia Kinzel | Germany |

The women's discus throw event at the 2025 Summer World University Games was held in Bochum, Germany, at Lohrheidestadion on 23 and 24 July.

== Records ==
Prior to the competition, the records were as follows:

| Record | Athlete (nation) | Distance (m) | Location | Date |
|---|---|---|---|---|
| Games record | Tsvetanka Khristova (BUL) | 67.96 m | Zagreb, Yugoslavia | 13 August 1987 |

== Results ==
=== Qualification ===
All athletes over 58.00 m (Q) or at least the 12 best performers (q) advance to the final.

==== Group A ====
| Place | Athlete | Nation | #1 | #2 | #3 | Result | Notes |
|---|---|---|---|---|---|---|---|
| 1 | Cierra Jackson | United States | x | 59.11 | | 59.11 m | Q |
| 2 | Antonia Kinzel | Germany | x | 57.36 | x | 57.36 m | q |
| 3 | Özlem Becerek | Turkey | 54.59 | 55.21 | x | 55.21 m | q |
| 4 | Weronika Muszyńska | Poland | 53.91 | x | x | 53.91 m | q |
| 5 | Sanya Yadav | India | 48.26 | 50.09 | 51.21 | 51.21 m | q, PB |
| 6 | Tyla Wasmuth | South Africa | 47.80 | 49.10 | 47.94 | 49.10 m | q |
| 7 | Marie Bovele Linaka | France | 46.85 | x | 49.08 | 49.08 m | q |
| 8 | Daniella Persson | Sweden | x | 46.66 | 46.01 | 46.66 m | |
| 9 | Chiang Ching-yuan | Chinese Taipei | 41.12 | 44.41 | x | 44.41 m | |
| 10 | Khadija Mahreen | Pakistan | 33.63 | x | x | 33.63 m | |

==== Group B ====
| Place | Athlete | Nation | #1 | #2 | #3 | Result | Notes |
|---|---|---|---|---|---|---|---|
| 1 | Caisa-Marie Lindfors | Sweden | 55.15 | 54.78 | 58.00 | 58.00 m | Q |
| 2 | Colette Uys | South Africa | 53.80 | 53.11 | 56.60 | 56.60 m | q |
| 3 | Joyce Oguama | Germany | 54.88 | x | 53.66 | 54.88 m | q |
| 4 | Amanda Ngandu-Ntumba | France | 53.22 | x | x | 53.22 m | q |
| 5 | Angeludi Asaah | United States | 50.67 | x | x | 50.67 m | q |
| 6 | Hyemin Yee | South Korea | 48.81 | x | 48.93 | 48.93 m | |
| 7 | Priya | India | 46.78 | 48.25 | x | 48.25 m | |
| — | Jiang Zhichao | China | x | x | x | NM | |
| — | Maria Castejón | Honduras | x | x | x | NM | |
| — | Jessica Gyamfi | Canada | x | x | x | NM | |

=== Final ===
| Place | Athlete | Nation | #1 | #2 | #3 | #4 | #5 | #6 | Result | Notes |
|---|---|---|---|---|---|---|---|---|---|---|
| 1st place, gold medalist(s) | Özlem Becerek | Turkey | 56.58 | x | x | 61.15 | x | x | 61.15 m | SB |
| 2nd place, silver medalist(s) | Caisa-Marie Lindfors | Sweden | 58.80 | 57.05 | 58.08 | 57.20 | x | 45.23 | 58.80 m | |
| 3rd place, bronze medalist(s) | Antonia Kinzel | Germany | 56.97 | x | x | 55.88 | 58.43 | 57.70 | 58.43 m | |
| 4 | Cierra Jackson | United States | 49.95 | 58.09 | x | x | x | x | 58.09 m | |
| 5 | Joyce Oguama | Germany | 57.45 | 58.07 | x | 56.96 | x | x | 58.07 m | |
| 6 | Colette Uys | South Africa | 57.13 | 53.02 | x | 53.80 | x | 57.50 | 57.50 m | |
| 7 | Amanda Ngandu-Ntumba | France | 55.33 | x | x | 54.96 | x | x | 55.33 m | |
| 8 | Angeludi Asaah | United States | 53.53 | x | x | x | x | 49.92 | 53.53 m | |
| 9 | Weronika Muszyńska | Poland | x | 49.29 | 52.48 | | | | 52.48 m | |
| 10 | Sanya Yadav | India | 49.82 | 49.88 | 48.56 | | | | 49.88 m | |
| 11 | Tyla Wasmuth | South Africa | x | 46.78 | 46.71 | | | | 46.78 m | |
