= Diving at the 2025 Summer World University Games – Men's 3 metre springboard =

Men's 3 metre springboard at the 2025 Summer World University Games
- Venue: Schwimm- und Sprunghalle im Europasportpark
- Location: Berlin
- Dates: 17 July (preliminary); 18 July (final)
- Competitors: 24 from 13 nations

Medalists
gold medal	Moritz Wesemann	Germany
silver medal	Hu Yukang	China
bronze medal	Luke Sitz	United States

The men's 3 metre springboard at the 2025 Summer World University Games in Rhine-Ruhr, Germany was held from 17 to 18 July 2025. The gold medal was won by Moritz Wesemann (Germany), the silver medal by Hu Yukang (China) and the bronze medal by Luke Sitz (United States).

== Schedule ==
All times are Central European Time (UTC+1)

Date	Time	Round
17 July 2025	11:45	Preliminary
18 July 2025	16:15	Final

== Results ==
24 divers entered the event, representing 13 nations. A maximum of two players per nation advanced to the final.

Rank	Name	Nation	Preliminary		Final						
Rank	Name	Nation	Score	Rank	Dive 1	Dive 2	Dive 3	Dive 4	Dive 5	Dive 6	Total
1st place, gold medalist(s)	Moritz Wesemann	Germany	390.35	7	61.20	73.10	84.00	68.40	81.70	85.80	454.20
2nd place, silver medalist(s)	Hu Yukang	China	439.35	1	61.50	78.75	78.75	68.00	89.30	72.15	448.45
3rd place, bronze medalist(s)	Luke Sitz	United States	398.55	4	63.00	69.70	67.50	84.00	70.30	75.25	429.75
4	Kim Yeong-taek	South Korea	399.35	3	60.00	63.55	71.40	57.00	82.25	77.00	411.20
5	Tim Axer	Germany	376.95	10	66.00	78.75	51.30	55.50	71.75	69.70	393.00
6	Kim Ji-wook	South Korea	390.50	6	58.50	69.70	64.60	77.00	48.00	73.50	391.30
7	Zhang Wenao	China	407.40	2	76.50	66.30	89.25	52.65	45.00	57.00	386.70
8	Stefano Belotti	Italy	364.70	11	74.40	76.50	60.00	57.75	62.70	54.40	385.75
9	Maxwell Miller	United States	350.80	15	58.50	55.80	66.00	61.25	67.50	56.10	365.15
10	Kyrylo Azarov	Ukraine	385.20	8	64.50	37.20	66.30	63.00	68.25	61.50	360.75
11	Grigorii Ivanov	Individual Neutral Athletes	378.35	9	63.00	56.10	62.90	66.50	42.00	66.50	357.00
12	Maksym Mirza	Ukraine	352.00	14	60.00	36.75	57.75	52.70	66.30	54.40	327.90
13	Fan Yi	China	393.60	5	Did not advance						
14	Kim Yeong-ho	South Korea	361.75	12	Did not advance						
15	Lou Massenberg	Germany	359.50	13	Did not advance						
16	Maxwell Weinrich	United States	339.45	16	Did not advance						
17	Reo Sakata	Japan	338.70	17	Did not advance						
18	Yevhen Naumenko	Ukraine	336.65	18	Did not advance						
19	Cameron Gammage	Great Britain	315.10	19	Did not advance						
20	Sebastian Konecki	Lithuania	302.70	20	Did not advance						
21	Vyacheslav Kachanov	Uzbekistan	299.35	21	Did not advance						
22	Tornike Onikashvili	Georgia	286.75	22	Did not advance						
23	Koga Niwa	Japan	277.60	23	Did not advance						
24	João Margiotto	Brazil	257.00	24	Did not advance						
