= Fencing at the 2025 Summer World University Games – Women's team foil =

Women's team foil at the 2025 Summer World University Games
- Venue: Messe Essen
- Location: Essen
- Dates: 21 July
- Nations: 12

Medalists
gold medal	Kim Ho-yeon; Mo Byeoli; Park Ji-hee; Sim So-eun	South Korea
silver medal	Giulia Amore; Irene Bertini; Carlotta Ferrari; Aurora Grandis	Italy
bronze medal	Ayano Iimura; Reina Iwamoto; Rino Nagase; Yuzuha Takeyama	Japan

The women's team foil at the 2025 Summer World University Games in Rhine-Ruhr, Germany was held 21 July 2025. South Korea won the gold medal by defeating Italy, who took the silver medal, with a final score of 45-26. Japan won the bronze medal by defeating France with a score of 45-38 in the third-place playoff match.

== Results bracket ==
The tournament is played as a single-elimination bracket (direct knockout). Teams that lose in the semifinals compete in a specific third-place playoff match to determine the bronze medal winner. A single team match consists of 9 individual bouts (legs) where every fencer from one team faces every fencer from the opposing team. : The score from each bout carries over to the next leg. Each leg adds 5 maximum points to the target cap (e.g., Leg 1 ends when a team reaches 5 points, Leg 2 ends at 10 points, and so on). The first team to reach 45 points (or the team with the most points when the total match time expires) wins the match.

Table of 16
9	Macau	45
8	Hungary	24
5	Poland	45
12	India	18
11	Spain	19
6	Germany	45
7	United States	45
10	New Zealand	29

Quarterfinals
1	Italy	45
9	Macau	13
5	Poland	32
4	Japan	45
3	France	45
6	Germany	38
7	United States	21
2	South Korea	45

Semifinals
1	Italy	45
4	Japan	34
3	France	31
2	South Korea	32

Final
1	Italy	26
2	South Korea	45
Third place
4	Japan	45
3	France	37
