= Diving at the 2025 Summer World University Games – Men's 1 metre springboard =

Men's 1 metre springboard at the 2025 Summer World University Games
- Venue: Schwimm- und Sprunghalle im Europasportpark
- Location: Berlin
- Dates: 21 July (preliminary); 22 July (final)
- Competitors: 23 from 14 nations

Medalists
gold medal	Zhang Wenao	China
silver medal	Hu Yukang	China
bronze medal	Tim Axer	Germany

The men's 1 metre springboard at the 2025 Summer World University Games in Rhine-Ruhr, Germany was held from 21 to 22 July 2025. The gold medal was won by Zhang Wenao (China), the silver medal by Hu Yukang (China) and the bronze medal by Tim Axer (Germany).

== Schedule ==
All times are Central European Time (UTC+1)

Date	Time	Round
21 July 2025	12:15	Preliminary
22 July 2025	14:30	Final

== Results ==
23 divers entered the event, representing 14 nations. A maximum of two players per nation advanced to the final.

Rank	Name	Nation	Preliminary		Final						
Rank	Name	Nation	Score	Rank	Dive 1	Dive 2	Dive 3	Dive 4	Dive 5	Dive 6	Total
1st place, gold medalist(s)	Zhang Wenao	China	396.45	2	69.00	77.50	75.20	67.20	66.00	70.95	425.85
2nd place, silver medalist(s)	Hu Yukang	China	404.90	1	63.00	39.00	62.40	68.00	64.35	72.00	368.75
3rd place, bronze medalist(s)	Tim Axer	Germany	299.35	11	48.00	63.00	61.50	65.10	59.20	58.00	354.80
4	Grigorii Ivanov	Individual Neutral Athletes	323.30	8	54.00	60.45	59.20	58.50	55.50	55.50	343.15
5	Maxwell Miller	United States	337.65	5	67.50	69.75	54.60	60.00	58.50	25.60	335.95
6	Tornike Onikashvili	Georgia	309.10	10	65.10	63.00	56.00	45.00	49.50	55.90	334.50
7	Holden Higbie	United States	334.80	6	69.75	27.00	66.00	55.50	49.50	60.80	328.55
8	Kim Ji-wook	South Korea	348.95	3	55.80	64.50	44.80	52.80	51.00	55.50	324.40
9	Choi Gan-gin	South Korea	346.40	4	51.15	57.00	54.40	36.00	31.50	60.00	290.05
10	Maksym Mirza	Ukraine	286.85	14	60.45	19.50	57.60	40.50	55.50	51.00	284.55
11	João Margiotto	Brazil	298.60	13	46.80	31.50	40.50	48.00	37.20	47.50	251.50
12	Cameron Gammage	Great Britain	298.95	12	54.60	31.05	41.85	54.00	18.00	38.40	237.90
13	Kim Yeong-taek	South Korea	324.80	7	Did not advance						
14	Mo Zhengxiong	China	317.15	9	Did not advance						
15	Koga Niwa	Japan	285.50	15	Did not advance						
16	Kyrylo Azarov	Ukraine	270.25	16	Did not advance						
17	Reo Sakata	Japan	268.80	17	Did not advance						
18	Jacob Jones	United States	264.40	18	Did not advance						
19	Damian O'Dell	Switzerland	257.60	19	Did not advance						
20	Sebastian Konecki	Lithuania	256.45	20	Did not advance						
21	Stefano Belotti	Italy	245.45	21	Did not advance						
22	Irakli Sakandelidze	Georgia	221.05	22	Did not advance						
23	Anathi Shozi	South Africa	189.60	23	Did not advance						
