= Fencing at the 2025 Summer World University Games – Men's team sabre =

Men's team sabre at the 2025 Summer World University Games
- Venue: Messe Essen
- Location: Essen
- Dates: 20 July
- Nations: 17

Medalists
gold medal	Hwang Hee-geun; Lim Jae-yun; Park Jung-ho; Park Sang-won	South Korea
silver medal	Cosimo Bertini; Marco Mastrullo; Mattia Rea; Edoardo Reale	Italy
bronze medal	Reo Hiwatashi; Hibiki Kato; Yuto Rikitake; Hayato Tsubo	Japan

The men's team sabre at the 2025 Summer World University Games in Rhine-Ruhr, Germany was held 20 July 2025. South Korea captured the gold medal, Italy secured the silver, and Japan took home the bronze.

== Results bracket ==
A team match consists of 9 individual bouts. Every fencer from one team fights every fencer from the opposing team once. Bouts carry over a cumulative score in increments of 5 points (5, 10, 15, up to 45). The first team to score 45 points, or the team leading when the time limit expires, wins the match. Teams are placed in the bracket based on the individual rankings of their fencers. Teams move through the Table of 16, Quarterfinals, Semifinals, and the Gold Medal Final. The two teams that lose in the semifinals compete in a separate match for the bronze medal.

Table of 32
17	Sweden	28
16	India	45

Table of 16
1	South Korea	45
16	India	11
9	Turkey	43
8	Germany	45
5	Japan	45
12	Australia	38
13	Azerbaijan	45
4	Kazakhstan	44
3	Italy	45
14	United States	27
11	Poland	45
6	France	40
7	Hungary	45
10	Hong Kong	31
15	Saudi Arabia	28
2	Spain	45

Quarterfinals
1	South Korea	45
8	Germany	32
5	Japan	45
13	Azerbaijan	32
3	Italy	45
11	Poland	36
7	Hungary	45
2	Spain	39

Semifinals
1	South Korea	45
5	Japan	30
3	Italy	45
7	Hungary	29

Final
1	South Korea	45
3	Italy	34
Third place
5	Japan	45
7	Hungary	39
