= Rowing at the 2025 Summer World University Games – Men's coxless four =

Men's coxless four at the 2025 Summer World University Games
- Venue: Regattabahn Duisburg
- Location: Duisburg
- Dates: 25 July (heats); 26 July (semifinals, final B); 27 July (final A)
- Competitors: 52 from 13 nations

Medalists
| gold medal | Reinier Vriens; Thomas Driessen; Pepijn Ermstrang; Kevin-Lee Bieshaar | Netherlands |
| silver medal | Ermanno Virgilio; Tommasso Rossi; Matteo Giorgetti; Francesco Graffione | Italy |
| bronze medal | Radim Hönig; Kryštof Blaha; Jan Lasota; Martin Pfeifer | Czech Republic |

The men's coxless four at the 2025 Summer World University Games in Rhine-Ruhr, Germany was held from 25 to 27 July 2025. Netherlands won the gold medal, Italy earned the silver medal and Czech Republic took the bronze medal.

== Schedule ==
All times are Central European Time (UTC+1)

| Date | Time | Round |
|---|---|---|
| 25 July 2025 | 11:10 | Heats |
| 26 July 2025 | 10:54 | Semifinals |
| 26 July 2025 | 13:48 | Final B |
| 27 July 2025 | 12:50 | Final A |

== Results ==
=== Heats ===
The two fastest boats in each heat and the six fastest times advanced directly to the semifinals. The remaining boats were eliminated.

==== Heat 1 ====
| Rank | Rowers | Country | Time | Notes |
|---|---|---|---|---|
| 1 | (b) Nikita Mohr (2) Simon Haible (3) Nils von Bülow (s) Jakob Waldhelm | Germany | 6:27.28 | Q |
| 2 | (b) Ermanno Virgilio (2) Francesco Graffione (3) Matteo Giorgetti (s) Tommaso Rossi | Italy | 6:30.05 | Q |
| 3 | (b) Ehros Smith (2) Robert Hirschson (3) Merwe Engelbrecht (s) Brian Thomson | South Africa | 6:32.41 | Q |
| 4 | (b) Lars Vevatne (2) Adrian Lund (3) Emil Johansen (s) Jostein Thon | Norway | 6:45.16 | Q |
| 5 | (b) Prayas Prayas (2) Mohit Kumar (3) Raghav Saran (s) Arvinder Mann | India | 7:04.22 | |

==== Heat 2 ====
| Rank | Rowers | Country | Time | Notes |
|---|---|---|---|---|
| 1 | (b) Kryštof Blaha (2) Jan Lasota (3) Radim Hönig (s) Martin Pfeifer | Czech Republic | 6:28.09 | Q |
| 2 | (b) Yaroslav Melnikov (2) Vladislav Galkin (3) Ivan Chernukhin (s) Timur Fomichyov | Kazakhstan | 6:31.04 | Q |
| 3 | (b) Eli Bunn (2) Ewan Morrow (3) Jack Corliss (s) Jesse Ryno | United States | 6:33.76 | Q |
| 4 | (b) Pablo Velasco (2) Rafael Gómez (3) Iker Castiñeira (s) Bruno Eder | Spain | 6:35.06 | Q |

==== Heat 3 ====
| Rank | Rowers | Country | Time | Notes |
|---|---|---|---|---|
| 1 | (b) Thomas Driessen (2) Pepijn Ermstrang (3) Kevin-Lee Bieshaar (s) Reinier Vriens | Netherlands | 6:22.51 | Q |
| 2 | (b) Jonas Verbraeken (2) Milan Van Massenhove (3) Jonathan De Man (s) Xander De Bruyne | Belgium | 6:26.66 | Q |
| 3 | (b) Samuel Barnett (2) George Johnson (3) Lewis Meates (s) Harry Galvan | New Zealand | 6:28.19 | Q |
| 4 | (b) Mitchell Bridge (2) Reilly Williams (3) Oscar Beregi (s) Nicholas Barlow | Australia | 6:34.11 | Q |

=== Semifinals ===
The three fastest boats in each heat advanced directly to the final A. The remaining boats were sent to the final B.

==== Semifinal 1 ====
| Rank | Rowers | Country | Time | Notes |
|---|---|---|---|---|
| 1 | (b) Reinier Vriens (2) Thomas Driessen (3) Pepijn Ermstrang (s) Kevin-Lee Bieshaar | Netherlands | 6:16.09 | Q |
| 2 | (b) Ermanno Virgilio (2) Tommaso Rossi (3) Matteo Giorgetti (s) Francesco Graffione | Italy | 6:19.09 | Q |
| 3 | (b) Jonas Verbraeken (2) Jonathan De Man (3) Xander De Bruyne (s) Milan Van Massenhove | Belgium | 6:21.62 | Q |
| 4 | (b) Robert Hirschson (2) Brian Thomson (3) Merwe Engelbrecht (s) Ehros Smith | South Africa | 6:25.24 | FB |
| 5 | (b) Eli Bunn (2) Ewan Morrow (3) Jack Corliss (s) Jesse Ryno | United States | 6:33.99 | FB |
| 6 | (b) Adrian Lund (2) Emil Johansen (3) Lars Vevatne (s) Jostein Thon | Norway | 6:47.67 | FB |

==== Semifinal 2 ====
| Rank | Rowers | Country | Time | Notes |
|---|---|---|---|---|
| 1 | (b) Radim Hönig (2) Kryštof Blaha (3) Jan Lasota (s) Martin Pfeifer | Czech Republic | 6:16.50 | Q |
| 2 | (b) Nils von Bülow (2) Simon Haible (3) Nikita Mohr (s) Jakob Waldhelm | Germany | 6:16.83 | Q |
| 3 | (b) Yaroslav Melnikov (2) Vladislav Galkin (3) Ivan Chernukhin (s) Timur Fomichyov | Kazakhstan | 6:19.34 | Q |
| 4 | (b) Samuel Barnett (2) George Johnson (3) Lewis Meates (s) Harry Galvan | New Zealand | 6:20.76 | FB |
| 5 | (b) Bruno Eder (2) Iker Castiñeira (3) Rafael Gómez (s) Pablo Velasco | Spain | 6:24.60 | FB |
| 6 | (b) Reilly Williams (2) Mitchell Bridge (3) Oscar Beregi (s) Nicholas Barlow | Australia | 6:30.61 | FB |

=== Finals ===
The A final determined the rankings for places 1 to 6. Additional rankings were determined in the other finals.

==== Final B ====
| Rank | Rowers | Country | Time | Total rank |
|---|---|---|---|---|
| 1 | (b) Eli Bunn (2) Ewan Morrow (3) Jack Corliss (s) Jesse Ryno | United States | 6:20.63 | 7 |
| 2 | (b) Samuel Barnett (2) George Johnson (3) Lewis Meates (s) Harry Galvan | New Zealand | 6:21.64 | 8 |
| 3 | (b) Robert Hirschson (2) Brian Thomson (3) Merwe Engelbrecht (s) Ehros Smith | South Africa | 6:21.84 | 9 |
| 4 | (b) Bruno Eder (2) Iker Castiñeira (3) Rafael Gómez (s) Pablo Velasco | Spain | 6:26.22 | 10 |
| 5 | (b) Reilly Williams (2) Mitchell Bridge (3) Oscar Beregi (s) Nicholas Barlow | Australia | 6:31.57 | 11 |
| 6 | (b) Adrian Lund (2) Emil Johansen (3) Lars Vevatne (s) Jostein Thon | Norway | 6:42.21 | 12 |

==== Final A ====
| Rank | Rowers | Country | Time | Notes |
|---|---|---|---|---|
| 1st place, gold medalist(s) | (b) Reinier Vriens (2) Thomas Driessen (3) Pepijn Ermstrang (s) Kevin-Lee Bieshaar | Netherlands | 6:23.21 | |
| 2nd place, silver medalist(s) | (b) Ermanno Virgilio (2) Tommaso Rossi (3) Matteo Giorgetti (s) Francesco Graffione | Italy | 6:26.82 | |
| 3rd place, bronze medalist(s) | (b) Radim Hönig (2) Kryštof Blaha (3) Jan Lasota (s) Martin Pfeifer | Czech Republic | 6:28.34 | |
| 4 | (b) Jonas Verbraeken (2) Jonathan De Man (3) Xander De Bruyne (s) Milan Van Massenhove | Belgium | 6:31.04 | |
| 5 | (b) Nils von Bülow (2) Simon Haible (3) Nikita Mohr (s) Jakob Waldhelm | Germany | 6:31.32 | |
| 6 | (b) Yaroslav Melnikov (2) Vladislav Galkin (3) Ivan Chernukhin (s) Timur Fomichyov | Kazakhstan | 6:32.41 | |
