= Diving at the 2025 Summer World University Games – Women's synchronized 3 metre springboard =

Women's synchronized 3 metre springboard at the 2025 Summer World University Games
- Venue: Schwimm- und Sprunghalle im Europasportpark
- Location: Berlin
- Dates: 18 July
- Competitors: 22 from 11 nations

Medalists
gold medal	Wang Weiying; Ouyang Yu	China
silver medal	Eliana Joyce; Lanie Gutch	United States
bronze medal	Lena Hentschel; Jette Müller	Germany

The women's synchronized 3 metre springboard at the 2025 Summer World University Games in Rhine-Ruhr, Germany was held 18 July 2025. The gold medal was won by Wang Weiying/Ouyang Yu (China), the silver medal by Eliana Joyce/Lanie Gutch (United States) and the bronze medal by Lena Hentschel/Jette Müller (Germany).

== Schedule ==
All times are Central European Time (UTC+1)

Date	Time	Round
18 July 2025	14:25	Final

== Results ==
22 divers entered the event, representing 11 nations.

Rank	Name	Nation	Final					
Rank	Name	Nation	Dive 1	Dive 2	Dive 3	Dive 4	Dive 5	Total
1st place, gold medalist(s)	Ouyang Yu; Wang Weiying	China	47.40	46.80	60.30	69.30	71.10	294.90
2nd place, silver medalist(s)	Lanie Gutch; Eliana Joyce	United States	43.20	39.00	53.46	65.52	64.80	265.98
3rd place, bronze medalist(s)	Lena Hentschel; Jette Müller	Germany	47.40	45.60	59.40	55.80	54.90	263.10
4	Oh Soo-yeon; Choi Yu-jeong	South Korea	46.20	45.60	51.03	50.40	58.50	251.73
5	Hana Kondo; Towa Norimatsu	Japan	38.40	40.20	51.30	53.10	47.52	230.52
6	Erika Sazonova; Uliana Manaenkova	Individual Neutral Athletes	40.80	31.20	54.27	51.24	46.80	224.31
7	Matilde Borello; Elettra Neroni	Italy	46.80	39.00	47.70	48.36	38.70	220.56
8	Heloá Camelo; Rebeca Nascimento	Brazil	39.00	39.60	54.00	45.00	38.64	216.24
9	Grace Brammer; Kerry-Leigh Morrison	South Africa	42.60	36.00	46.98	38.64	44.52	208.74
10	Serina Haldorsen; Anne Holm	Norway	37.80	40.20	42.48	36.12	44.55	201.15
11	Mariami Shanidze; Tekle Sharia	Georgia	39.60	36.00	0.00	Withdrawn		75.60
