= Judo at the 2025 Summer World University Games – Women's 48 kg =

Women's 48 kg at the 2025 Summer World University Games
- Venue: Messe Essen
- Location: Essen
- Dates: 23 July
- Competitors: 25

Medalists
gold medal	Mizuki Harada	Japan
silver medal	Zhuang Wenna	China
bronze medal	Laziza Haydarova	Uzbekistan
bronze medal	Helen Habib	Germany

The women's 48 kg at the 2025 Summer World University Games in Rhine-Ruhr, Germany was held 23 July 2025. Mizuki Harada of Japan captured the gold medal. Zhuang Wenna of China took home the silver medal. The bronze medals were awarded to Laziza Haydarova of Uzbekistan and Helen Habib of Germany.

== Schedule ==
All times are Central European Time (UTC+1)

Date	Time	Event
23 July 2015	09:00	Preliminary Rounds
23 July 2015	17:00	Final Block

== Results ==
Athletes advanced through direct knockout rounds—including the round of 32, round of 16, quarterfinals, and semifinals—to determine the two finalists fighting for the gold and silver medals. Parallel to the main bracket, a repechage system allowed defeated quarterfinalists to work their way back into the tournament, culminating in two separate bronze medal matches where the repechage winners faced the losing semifinalists.

Round of 32
G Sarantuya (MGL)	001
A Sykish (UKR)	000 (yellow card)
Chiu Cj (TPE)	021
M Elias (LBN)	000
V Keo (CAM)	000 (yellow card)
Z Ertem (TUR)	020
P Szlachta (POL)	100
M van der Scheer (NED)	000 (yellow card)
H Habib (GER)	100
K Tanimoto (USA)	000
E Ortega (ECU)	000
R Kareliya (IND)	100
D Burkeyeva (KAZ)	001
M Nunes (BRA)	000 (yellow card)
M Harada (JPN)	101
S Shaw (GBR)	000

Round of 16
Zhuang Wn (CHN)	100
G Sarantuya (MGL)	000 (yellow card)
J Semikolenova (AIN)	000
Chiu Cj (TPE)	100
R Koszegi (HUN)	000
Z Ertem (TUR)	100
M Rodríguez (ESP)	000
P Szlachta (POL)	100
K Aliyeva (AZE)	010
H Habib (GER)	100
L Haydarova (UZB)	100
R Kareliya (IND)	000
Lee Kh (KOR)	000
D Burkeyeva (KAZ)	001 (yellow card)
K Esposito (MLT)	000
M Harada (JPN)	020

Quarter-finals
Zhuang Wn (CHN)	101
Chiu Cj (TPE)	000
Z Ertem (TUR)	001 (yellow card)
P Szlachta (POL)	000
H Habib (GER)	002
L Haydarova (UZB)	102
D Burkeyeva (KAZ)	000
M Harada (JPN)	110

Semi-finals
Zhuang Wn (CHN)	111 (yellow card)
Z Ertem (TUR)	000
L Haydarova (UZB)	000
M Harada (JPN)	010

Final
Zhuang Wn (CHN)	000 (yellow card)
M Harada (JPN)	011 (yellow card)

Repechage Phases

Repechage
Chiu Cj (TPE)	000
P Szlachta (POL)	100
H Habib (GER)	100
D Burkeyeva (KAZ)	000 (yellow card)

Bronze medal
P Szlachta (POL)	000 (yellow card)
Z Ertem (TUR)	010
H Habib (GER)	102
L Haydarova (UZB)	001 (yellow card)
