= Diving at the 2025 Summer World University Games – Women's synchronized 10 metre platform =

Women's synchronized 10 metre platform at the 2025 Summer World University Games
- Venue: Schwimm- und Sprunghalle im Europasportpark
- Location: Berlin
- Dates: 17 July
- Competitors: 14 from 7 nations

Medalists
gold medal	He Yanwei; Lu Wei	China
silver medal	Carolina Coordes; Pauline Pfeif	Germany
bronze medal	Lanie Gutch; Kayleigh Clark	United States

The women's synchronized 10 metre platform at the 2025 Summer World University Games in Rhine-Ruhr, Germany was held 17 July 2025. The gold medal was won by He Yanwei/Lu Wei (China), the silver medal by Carolina Coordes/Pauline Pfeif (Germany) and the bronze medal by Lanie Gutch/Kayleigh Clark (United States).

== Schedule ==
All times are Central European Time (UTC+1)

Date	Time	Round
17 July 2025	16:30	Final

== Results ==
14 divers entered the event, representing 7 nations.

Rank	Name	Nation	Final					
Rank	Name	Nation	Dive 1	Dive 2	Dive 3	Dive 4	Dive 5	Total
1st place, gold medalist(s)	He Yanwei; Lu Wei	China	51.60	51.00	71.10	80.64	75.84	330.18
2nd place, silver medalist(s)	Pauline Pfeif; Carolina Coordes	Germany	43.20	48.60	64.32	68.40	70.08	294.60
3rd place, bronze medalist(s)	Lanie Gutch; Kayleigh Clark	United States	40.80	47.40	65.70	47.04	55.68	256.62
4	Sofia Knight; Hannah Smith	Australia	28.20	42.00	58.50	59.52	63.36	251.58
5	Kim Seo-yeon; Kim Seung-hyun	South Korea	45.60	42.00	56.28	46.11	42.63	232.62
6	Tonje Welander; Silje Welander	Norway	38.40	39.60	40.71	46.50	40.56	205.77
7	Meiho Nishizawa; Karen Yamasaki	Japan	48.60	46.20	44.40	0.00	Withdrawn	139.20
