= Diving at the 2025 Summer World University Games – Mixed synchronized 3 metre springboard =

Mixed synchronized 3 metre springboard at the 2025 Summer World University Games
- Venue: Schwimm- und Sprunghalle im Europasportpark
- Location: Berlin
- Dates: 17 July
- Competitors: 12 from 6 nations

Medalists
| gold medal | Lena Hentschel; Luis Avila Sanchez | Germany |
| silver medal | Fan Yi; Mei Yingxin | China |
| bronze medal | Maxwell Miller; Eliana Joyce | United States |

The mixed synchronized 3 metre springboard at the 2025 Summer World University Games in Rhine-Ruhr, Germany was held 17 July 2025. The gold medal was won by Lena Hentschel/Luis Avila Sanchez (Germany), the silver medal by Fan Yi/Mei Yingxin (China) and the bronze medal by Maxwell Miller/Eliana Joyce (United States).

== Schedule ==
All times are Central European Time (UTC+1)

| Date | Time | Round |
|---|---|---|
| 17 July 2025 | 14:45 | Final |

== Results ==
12 divers entered the event, representing 6 nations.

| Rank | Name | Nation | Final | | | | | |
| Rank | Name | Nation | Dive 1 | Dive 2 | Dive 3 | Dive 4 | Dive 5 | Total |
|---|---|---|---|---|---|---|---|---|
| 1st place, gold medalist(s) | Lena Hentschel; Luis Avila Sanchez | Germany | 48.60 | 45.00 | 67.50 | 64.80 | 62.31 | 288.21 |
| 2nd place, silver medalist(s) | Fan Yi; Mei Yingxin | China | 39.60 | 43.20 | 66.60 | 55.80 | 70.20 | 275.40 |
| 3rd place, bronze medalist(s) | Maxwell Miller; Eliana Joyce | United States | 45.00 | 44.40 | 54.27 | 65.70 | 56.28 | 265.65 |
| 4 | Grigorii Ivanov; Erika Sazonova | Individual Neutral Athletes | 46.20 | 43.80 | 54.27 | 59.64 | 61.32 | 265.23 |
| 5 | Kim Ji-wook; Oh Soo-yeon | South Korea | 45.60 | 46.20 | 56.70 | 52.92 | 63.00 | 264.42 |
| 6 | Shuta Yamada; Karen Yamasaki | Japan | 40.80 | 46.80 | 55.80 | 42.84 | 52.08 | 238.32 |
