= Fencing at the 2025 Summer World University Games – Women's team sabre =

Women's team sabre at the 2025 Summer World University Games
- Venue: Messe Essen
- Location: Essen
- Dates: 22 July
- Nations: 13

Medalists
gold medal	Choi Se-bin; Jeon Ha-young; Kim Jeong-mi; Seon Eun-bi	South Korea
silver medal	Kelly Lusinier; Mathilde Mouroux; Garance Roger; Lola Tranquille	France
bronze medal	Alessia Di Carlo; Benedetta Fusetti; Michela Landi; Claudia Rotili	Italy

The women's team sabre at the 2025 Summer World University Games in Rhine-Ruhr, Germany was held 22 July 2025. South Korea winning the gold medal, France taking the silver medal, and Italy earning the bronze medal.

== Results bracket ==
Matches used the standard 9-bout Italian relay system. Each bout was a continuation of the previous score, progressing in increments of 5 points (5, 10, 15, up to 45). The first team to score 45 points (or the team leading when the 3-minute time limit for the final bout expired) won the match. Teams were seeded into the bracket using the combined individual placement points of their top athletes from the individual event. The tournament was a single-elimination bracket (knockout format) starting from the direct elimination table. Defeated semifinalists played an extra match to determine the bronze medal winner, while the two final teams fought for gold and silver.

Table of 16
9	India	31
8	Spain	45
5	Italy	45
12	Kazakhstan	24
13	United States	38
4	Hong Kong	45
11	Poland	35
6	Japan	45
7	Turkey	45
10	Germany	42

Quarterfinals
1	South Korea	45
8	Spain	26
5	Italy	45
4	Hong Kong	41
3	France	45
6	Japan	35
7	Turkey	39
2	Hungary	45

Semifinals
1	South Korea	45
5	Italy	38
3	France	45
2	Hungary	33

Final
1	South Korea	45
3	France	43
Third place
5	Italy	45
2	Hungary	43
