= Water polo at the 2025 Summer World University Games =

Water polo at the Universiade
- Venue: ASC Duisburg
- Dates: 17–26 July 2023
- Teams: 8 (men) & 8 (women)

Water polo at the 2025 Summer World University Games was played from 17 to 26 July to 2025 at ASC Duisburg, in Duisburg. 16 teams participated in the tournament.

== Qualification ==
Following the FISU regulations, there were a maximum of 12 teams in men's water polo and 10 in women's water polo. If there was a larger number of teams interested, they were selected by:

- The entry and the payment of guarantee
- Those five teams finishing top rankings of the previous edition will be automatically qualified. Due the COVID-19 pandemic this rule can't be applied in 2021 and 2025 for the women's tournament
- Those three teams finishing bottom rankings of the previous edition could be replaced by new applying teams. Due the COVID-19 pandemic this rule can't be applied in 2021 and 2025 for the women's tournament
- The host is automatically qualified.
- The remaining teams will be selected by wild card system according to geographical, continental representation, FISU ranking and WA ranking.

== Medal summary ==
=== Medal table ===
| Rank | Nation | Gold | Silver | Bronze | Total |
|---|---|---|---|---|---|
| 1 | Germany (GER)* | 1 | 0 | 1 | 2 |
| 1 | Italy (ITA) | 1 | 0 | 1 | 2 |
| 3 | United States (USA) | 0 | 2 | 0 | 2 |
| Totals (3 entries) | | 2 | 2 | 2 | 6 |

Source: rhineruhr2025.com

=== Medal events ===
| Event | Gold | Silver | Bronze |
|---|---|---|---|
| Men | Italy (ITA); Rocco Valle; Stefano Ballarini; Pietro Faraglia; Mattia Rocchino; Davide Occhione; Lorenzo Giribaldi; Alessandro Gullotta; Alessandro Carnesecchi; Andrea Condemi; Alessandro Balzarini; Andrea Patchaliev; Federico Patti; Nicolo' Da Rold | United States (USA); Nathan Tauscher; Alexander Heenan; Elias Liechty; Hayden O'Hare; Wade Sherlock; Benjamin Larsen; Charles Matthews; Peter Castillo; Gray Carson; Trey Doten; Noah Rowe; Boden Brinkema; Harper Gardner | Germany (GER); Max Spittank; Zoran Bozic; Tobias Bauer; Elias Metten; Jan Rottermund; Moritz Ostmann; Finn Rottermund; Yannek Chiru; Sascha Seifert; Till Hofmann; Luk Jaschke; Mark Gansen |
| Women | Germany (GER); Darja Heinbichner; Franka Lipinski; Ioanna Petiki; Sinia Plotz; Emma-Eliza Koch; Emma Seehafer; Anne Rieck; Mona Saternus; Greta Tadday; Elena Ludwig; Jana Stuwe; Marijke Kijlstra | United States (USA); Lauren Steele; Ana Pieper; Llilian Gess; Carly McMurray; Katherine O'Dea; Maile Turner; Jenna Human; Dania Innis; Jailynn Robinson; Alison Sagara; Jacqueline Walters; Natalie Stryker; Josephine Niz | Italy (ITA); Gaia Acerbotti; Guya Zizza; Federica Morrone; Marta Misiti; Vittoria Sbruzzi; Emma De March; Giorgia Klatowski; Francesca Colletta; Lavinia Papi; Cristina Malluzzo; Aurora Longo; Benedetta Cabona; Ludovica Celona |

== Draw ==
The draw was held on 7 April 2025 at the Luftschiffhangar in Mülheim. The women's team of Chile was later replaced by Turkey.

| Men's tournament | | Women's tournament | |
| Pool A | Pool B | Pool A | Pool B |
|---|---|---|---|
| Italy | Hungary | Italy | Hungary |
| Georgia | Germany | Japan | Australia |
| South Korea | United States | United States | Germany |
| Chile | New Zealand | New Zealand | Turkey |
