= Rowing at the 2025 Summer World University Games – Women's eight =

Women's eight at the 2025 Summer World University Games
- Venue: Regattabahn Duisburg
- Location: Duisburg
- Dates: 25 July (heat); 27 July (final)
- Competitors: 54 from 6 nations

Medalists
gold medal	Sarah Marshall; Daisy Faithfull; Sophia Issberner; Tia Lenihan; Daisy Jackson; Phoebe Snowden; Zoe McCutcheon; Holly Youd; Beatrice Argyle	Great Britain
silver medal	Martine Kamminga; Evie Rademaker; Sanne de Kleijn; Rowin Morsinkhof; Sophie Goldschmeding; Anna Sanders; Lotte Jansen; Fréderique Pals; Fenna Beukema	Netherlands
bronze medal	Leah Brannon; Lilian Wilhelm; Ashley Johnson; Katherine Myers; Ryleigh White; Sabrina Gottschalk; Tiara Dye; Lindsey Troftgruben; Taylor Denger	United States

The women's eight at the 2025 Summer World University Games in Rhine-Ruhr, Germany was held from 25 to 27 July 2025. Great Britain won the gold medal, Netherlands earned the silver medal and United States took the bronze medal.

== Schedule ==
All times are Central European Time (UTC+1)

Date	Time	Round
25 July 2025	13:18	Heat
27 July 2025	13:44	Final

== Results ==
=== Heat ===
The six fastest boats advanced directly to the final A.

Rank	Rowers	Country	Time	Notes
1	(b) Tia Lenihan (2) Sarah Marshall (3) Holly Youd (4) Beatrice Argyle (5) Phoebe Snowden (6) Daisy Faithfull (7) Sophia Issberner (s) Zoe McCutcheon (c) Daisy Jackson	Great Britain	6:38.19	Q
2	(b) Tabea Kuhnert (2) Florian Koch (3) Katharina Bauer (4) Olivia Clotten (5) Judith Guhse (6) Luise Bachmann (7) Paula Hartmann (s) Paula Gerundt (c) Lene Mührs	Germany	6:40.46	Q
3	(b) Sanne de Kleijn (2) Anna Sanders (3) Evie Rademaker (4) Lotte Jansen (5) Rowin Morsinkhof (6) Fenna Beukema (7) Martine Kamminga (s) Sophie Goldschmeding (c) Frédérique Pals	Netherlands	6:44.51	Q
4	(b) Leah Brannon (2) Lilian Wilhelm (3) Ashley Johnson (4) Katherine Myers (5) Ryleigh White (6) Sabrina Gottschalk (7) Tiara Dye (s) Taylor Denger (c) Lindsey Troftgruben	United States	6:45.51	Q
5	(b) Anna Rossi (2) Angelica Erpini (3) Samantha Premerl (4) Vittoria Calabrese (5) Anita Boldrino (6) Gioconda Iannicelli (7) Maria Zerboni (s) Benedetta De Martino (c) Matilde Barison	Italy	6:56.52	Q
6	(b) Karla Remacha (2) Lidia Florido (3) Haizea Gozategi (4) Noa Guasch (5) Martina Moya (6) Inmaculada Rius (7) Inés Martin-Jimenez (s) Paula Tarradas (c) Carlota González	Spain	7:31.50	Q

=== Final ===
The final determined the rankings for places 1 to 6.

Rank	Rowers	Country	Time	Notes
1st place, gold medalist(s)	(b) Sarah Marshall (2) Daisy Faithfull (3) Sophia Issberner (4) Tia Lenihan (5) Daisy Jackson (6) Phoebe Snowden (7) Zoe McCutcheon (s) Holly Youd (c) Beatrice Argyle	Great Britain	6:42.46	
2nd place, silver medalist(s)	(b) Martine Kamminga (2) Evie Rademaker (3) Sanne de Kleijn (4) Rowin Morsinkhof (5) Sophie Goldschmeding (6) Anna Sanders (7) Lotte Jansen (s) Frédérique Pals (c) Fenna Beukema	Netherlands	6:45.85	
3rd place, bronze medalist(s)	(b) Leah Brannon (2) Lilian Wilhelm (3) Ashley Johnson (4) Katherine Myers (5) Ryleigh White (6) Sabrina Gottschalk (7) Tiara Dye (s) Lindsey Troftgruben (c) Taylor Denger	United States	6:48.46	
4	(b) Judith Guhse (2) Katharina Bauer (3) Paula Gerundt (4) Tabea Kuhnert (5) Lene Mührs (6) Paula Hartmann (7) Olivia Clotten (s) Malin von der Aue (c) Florian Koch	Germany	6:53.08	
5	(b) Vittoria Calabrese (2) Matilde Barison (3) Angelica Erpini (4) Gioconda Iannicelli (5) Anita Boldrino (6) Anna Rossi (7) Maria Zerboni (s) Samantha Premerl (c) Benedetta De Martino	Italy	6:59.87	
6	(b) Haizea Gozategi (2) Noa Guasch (3) Martina Moya (4) Paula Tarradas (5) Inmaculada Rius (6) Inés Martin-Jimenez (7) Karla Remacha (s) Lidia Florido (c) Carlota González	Spain	7:10.74	
