= Swimming at the 2025 Summer World University Games – Women's 1500 metre freestyle =

Women's 1500 metre freestyle at the 2025 Summer World University Games
- Venue: Schwimm- und Sprunghalle im Europasportpark
- Location: Berlin
- Dates: 20 July (heats); 21 July (final)
- Competitors: 11 from 10 nations

Medalists
gold medal	Kate Hurst	United States
silver medal	Genevieve Jorgenson	United States
bronze medal	Niko Aoki	Japan

The women's 1500 metre freestyle at the 2025 Summer World University Games in Rhine-Ruhr, Germany was held from 18 to 19 July 2025. Kate Hurst from the United States won the gold medal, Genevieve Jorgenson from the United States took the silver medal and Niko Aoki from Japan earned the bronze medal.

== Schedule ==
All times are Central European Time (UTC+1)

Date	Time	Round
20 July	09:00	Heats
21 July	19:14	Final

== Records ==
Prior to the competition, the world and Universiade records were as follows.

Category	Swimmer	Record	Date	Place	Event
World record	(United States) Katie Ledecky	15:20.48	16 May 2018	Indianapolis, United States	TYR Pro Swim Series
Universiade record	(Italy) Simona Quadarella	15:57.90	23 August 2017	Taipei, Chinese Taipei	2017 Summer Universiade

== Results ==
=== Heats ===
All entered athletes competed across multiple seeded heats in the morning session. Swimmers with the top 8 fastest times advanced, regardless of which individual heat they swam.

Rank	Heat	Lane	Swimmer	Nation	Time	Notes
1	1	4	Genevieve Jorgenson	United States	16:23.82	Q
2	2	4	Kate Hurst	United States	16:26.26	Q
3	1	3	Rebecca Diaconescu	Romania	16:29.18	Q
4	2	5	Noemi Cesarano	Italy	16:33.79	Q
5	2	3	Niko Aoki	Japan	16:35.85	Q
6	2	6	Fleur Lewis	Great Britain	16:40.49	Q
7	1	5	Marian Plöger	Germany	16:41.65	Q
8	1	2	Nóra Flück	Hungary	16:46.80	Q
9	1	6	Stephanie Houtman	South Africa	17:03.33	
10	1	7	Amélie Bertschi	Switzerland	17:15.01	
11	2	7	Ada Hakkarainen	Finland	17:46.26	

=== Final ===
The fastest 8 swimmers competed in a single race to determine the gold, silver and bronze medalists.

Rank	Lane	Swimmer	Nation	Time	Notes
1st place, gold medalist(s)	5	Kate Hurst	United States	16:15.40	
2nd place, silver medalist(s)	4	Genevieve Jorgenson	United States	16:15.44	
3rd place, bronze medalist(s)	2	Niko Aoki	Japan	16:19.81	
4	7	Fleur Lewis	Great Britain	16:25.71	
5	6	Noemi Cesarano	Italy	16:26.54	
6	1	Marian Plöger	Germany	16:31.98	
7	8	Nóra Flück	Hungary	16:39.72	
8	3	Rebecca Diaconescu	Romania	16:41.67	
