= Rowing at the 2025 Summer World University Games – Women's coxless four =

Women's coxless four at the 2025 Summer World University Games
- Venue: Regattabahn Duisburg
- Location: Duisburg
- Dates: 25 July (heats); 27 July (finals A—B)
- Competitors: 48 from 12 nations

Medalists
gold medal	Sarah Marshall; Phoebe Snowden; Zoe McCutcheon; Holly Youd	Great Britain
silver medal	Lene Mührs; Paula Hartmann; Olivia Clotten; Luise Bachmann	Germany
bronze medal	Isa Dignum; Vera Versteegh; Nienke von Hebel; Lydia Knevel	Netherlands

The women's coxless four at the 2025 Summer World University Games in Rhine-Ruhr, Germany was held from 25 to 27 July 2025. Great Britain won the gold medal, Germany earned the silver medal and Nethlerlands took the bronze medal.

== Schedule ==
All times are Central European Time (UTC+1)

Date	Time	Round
25 July 2025	11:34	Heats
27 July 2025	9:02	Final B
27 July 2025	12:30	Final A

== Results ==
=== Heats ===
The two fastest boats in each heat and the two fastest times advanced directly to the final A. The remaining boats advanced to the final B.

==== Heat 1 ====
Rank	Rowers	Country	Time	Notes
1	(b) Lene Mührs (2) Olivia Clotten (3) Luise Bachmann (s) Paula Hartmann	Germany	6:55.65	Q
2	(b) Wiktoria Zawadzka (2) Wiktoria Lewandowska (3) Zuzanna Jasińska (s) Dominika Gałka	Poland	7:15.47	Q
3	(b) Haizea Gozategi (2) Noa Guasch (3) Inmaculada Rius (s) Inés Martin-Jimenez	Spain	7:21.55	FB
4	(b) Sophia Gruenling (2) Sarah Galligan (3) Jessica Schneider (s) Amari Randall	United States	7:26.91	FB
5	(b) Oline Skorgevik (2) Marie Andrup-Næss (3) Erica Balstad (s) Heidi Høeg	Norway	7:32.79	FB
6	(b) Jashanpreet Kaur (2) Arunprit Kaur (3) Pooja (s) Avinash Kaur	India	7:49.62	FB

==== Heat 2 ====
Rank	Rowers	Country	Time	Notes
1	(b) Zoe McCutcheon (2) Sarah Marshall (3) Holly Youd (s) Phoebe Snowden	Great Britain	6:59.91	Q
2	(b) Nienke von Hebel (2) Isa Dignum (3) Vera Versteegh (s) Lydia Knevel	Netherlands	7:03.26	Q
3	(b) Anna Rossi (2) Matilde Barison (3) Anita Boldrino (s) Maria Zerboni	Italy	7:08.20	Q
4	(b) Ceilidh Aho (2) Olivia Calbeck (3) Madelyn Vandermeer (s) Ceilidh MacDonald	Canada	7:16.19	Q
5	(b) Elly Ready (2) April Draney (3) Nancy Duncan-Banks (s) Alice Ready	Australia	7:20.18	FB
6	(b) Lenka Boušková (2) Agáta Janíková (3) Zuzana Pazourková (s) Evelína Mašínová	Czech Republic	7:32.64	FB

=== Finals ===
The A final determined the rankings for places 1 to 6. Additional rankings were determined in the other finals.

==== Final B ====
Rank	Rowers	Country	Time	Total rank
1	(b) Elly Ready (2) Nancy Duncan-Banks (3) April Draney (s) Alice Ready	Australia	7:31.55	7
2	(b) Haizea Gozategi (2) Inés Martin-Jimenez (3) Inmaculada Rius (s) Noa Guasch	Spain	7:41.36	8
3	(b) Evelina Mašínová (2) Zuzana Pazourková (3) Lenka Boušková (s) Agáta Janíková	Czech Republic	7:45.96	9
4	(b) Erica Balstad (2) Heidi Høeg (3) Oline Skorgevik (s) Marie Andrup-Næss	Norway	7:46.04	10
5	(b) Sophia Gruenling (2) Sarah Galligan (3) Jessica Schneider (s) Amari Randall	United States	7:46.41	11
6	(b) Pooja (2) Jashanpreet Kaur (3) Avinash Kaur (s) Arunprit Kaur	India	8:02.85	12

==== Final A ====
Rank	Rowers	Country	Time	Notes
1st place, gold medalist(s)	(b) Sarah Marshall (2) Phoebe Snowden (3) Zoe McCutcheon (s) Holly Youd	Great Britain	7:03.21	
2nd place, silver medalist(s)	(b) Lene Mührs (2) Paula Hartmann (3) Olivia Clotten (s) Luise Bachmann	Germany	7:06.67	
3rd place, bronze medalist(s)	(b) Isa Dignum (2) Vera Versteegh (3) Nienke von Hebel (s) Lydia Knevel	Netherlands	7:18.98	
4	(b) Maria Zerboni (2) Anna Rossi (3) Anita Boldrino (s) Matilde Barison	Italy	7:23.70	
5	(b) Ceilidh Aho (2) Ceilidh MacDonald (3) Madelyn Vandermeer (s) Olivia Calbeck	Canada	7:28.56	
6	(b) Wiktoria Zawadzka (2) Zuzanna Jasińska (3) Wiktoria Lewandowska (s) Dominika Gałka	Poland	7:35.99	
