= Rowing at the 2025 Summer World University Games – Men's eight =

Men's eight at the 2025 Summer World University Games
- Venue: Regattabahn Duisburg
- Location: Duisburg
- Dates: 25 July (heats); 27 July (final)
- Competitors: 63 from 7 nations

Medalists
gold medal	Edward Ridley; Maximilian Mills; Finn Mosedale; Benedict Newton; Benjamin Brockway; Lucas Bowes; Samuel Ford; Joshua Burke; Zahir Ala	Great Britain
silver medal	Bartłomiej Sopoński; Kazimir Kujda; Szymon Tomiak; Jakub Sobański; Tomek Lewicki; Emilian Jackowiak; Jerzy Kaczmarek; Oskar Streich; Magdalena Ładna	Poland
bronze medal	Bastiaan van Gerwen; Samuel Meijdam; Lancelot Bloemen; Bart Berbers; Floris Bij de Weg; Bart Lauwers; Joppe Visch; Jaap Worm; Hanne Gielliet	Netherlands

The men's eight at the 2025 Summer World University Games in Rhine-Ruhr, Germany was held from 25 to 27 July 2025. Great Britain won the gold medal, Poland earned the silver medal and Nethlerlands took the bronze medal.

== Schedule ==
All times are Central European Time (UTC+1)

Date	Time	Round
25 July 2025	13:02	Heats
27 July 2025	14:04	Final

== Results ==
=== Heats ===
The two fastest boats in each heat and the two fastest times advanced directly to the final A. The remaining boats were eliminated.

==== Heat 1 ====
Rank	Rowers	Country	Time	Notes
1	(b) Edward Ridley (2) Samuel Ford (3) Benjamin Brockway (4) Joshua Burke (5) Finn Mosedale (6) Zahir Ala (7) Maximilian Mills (s) Lucas Bowes (c) Benedict Newton	Great Britain	5:51.36	Q
2	(b) Emilian Jackowiak (2) Oskar Streich (3) Kazimir Kujda (4) Magdalena Ładna (5) Tomek Lewicki (6) Bartłomiej Sopoński (7) Szymon Tomiak (s) Jerzy Kaczmarek (c) Jakub Sobański	Poland	5:53.95	Q
3	(b) Iker dos Reis (2) Sergi Olid (3) Rafael Gómez (4) Iker Castiñeira (5) Jordi Alexandrescu (6) Francisco Figueira (7) Bruno Eder (s) Pablo Velasco (c) Emma Vázquez	Spain	6:33.37	Q
4	(b) Ankit (2) Amandeep Singh (3) Tejas Gadade (4) Rajat Kumar (5) Gurpreet Singh (6) Gurpreet Shah (7) Sourbh (s) Rahul (c) Priyanshpreet Singh	India	6:38.86	

==== Heat 2 ====
Rank	Rowers	Country	Time	Notes
1	(b) Jannik Metzger (2) Leonard Brahms (3) Till Martini (4) Tom Tewes (5) Mark Hinrichs (6) Ben Gebauer (7) Julian Garth (s) Jasper Angl (c) Julius Kaim	Germany	5:55.53	Q
2	(b) Joppe Visch (2) Bart Berbers (3) Lancelot Bloemen (4) Bart Lauwers (5) Floris Bij De Weg (6) Hanne Gielliet (7) Samuel Meijdam (s) Jaap Worm (c) Bastiaan van Gerwen	Netherlands	5:56.32	Q
3	(b) Alessandro Gardino (2) Ermanno Virgilio (3) Andrea Pazzagli (4) Francesco Graffione (5) Matteo Giorgetti (6) Tommaso Rossi (7) Filippo Wiesenfeld (s) Paolo Covini (c) Edoardo Rocchi	Italy	6:12.87	Q

=== Final ===
The final determined the rankings for places 1 to 6.

Rank	Rowers	Country	Time	Notes
1st place, gold medalist(s)	(b) Edward Ridley (2) Maximilian Mills (3) Finn Mosedale (4) Benedict Newton (5) Benjamin Brockway (6) Lucas Bowes (7) Samuel Ford (s) Joshua Burke (c) Zahir Ala	Great Britain	5:51.39	
2nd place, silver medalist(s)	(b) Bartłomiej Sopoński (2) Kazimir Kujda (3) Szymon Tomiak (4) Jakub Sobański (5) Tomek Lewicki (6) Emilian Jackowiak (7) Jerzy Kaczmarek (s) Oskar Streich (c) Magdalena Ładna	Poland	5:53.68	
3rd place, bronze medalist(s)	(b) Bastiaan Van Gerwen (2) Samuel Meijdam (3) Lancelot Bloemen (4) Bart Berbers (5) Floris Bij De Weg (6) Bart Lauwers (7) Joppe Visch (s) Jaap Worm (c) Hanne Gielliet	Netherlands	5:56.54	
4	(b) Mark Hinrichs (2) Ben Gebauer (3) Julius Kaim (4) Jannik Metzger (5) Julian Garth (6) Tom Tewes (7) Leonard Brahms (s) Jasper Angl (c) Till Martini	Germany	5:58.76	
5	(b) Ermanno Virgilio (2) Tommaso Rossi (3) Matteo Giorgetti (4) Francesco Graffione (5) Andrea Pazzagli (6) Edoardo Rocchi (7) Paolo Covini (s) Alessandro Gardino (c) Filippo Wiesenfeld	Italy	6:14.76	
6	(b) Bruno Eder (2) Iker Castiñeira (3) Jordi Alexandrescu (4) Francisco Figueira (5) Iker dos Reis (6) Sergi Olid (7) Rafael Gómez (s) Pablo Velasco (c) Emma Vázquez	Spain	6:19.60	
