= Judo at the 2025 Summer World University Games – Women's 78 kg =

Women's 78 kg at the 2025 Summer World University Games
- Venue: Messe Essen
- Location: Essen
- Dates: 25 July
- Competitors: 19

Medalists
gold medal	Anna Monta Olek	Germany
silver medal	Beatriz Freitas	Brazil
bronze medal	Kim Min-ju	South Korea
bronze medal	Emma Krapu	Finland

The women's 78 kg at the 2025 Summer World University Games in Rhine-Ruhr, Germany was held 25 July 2025. Anna Monta Olek of Germany captured the gold medal. Beatriz Freitas of Brazil took home the silver medal. The bronze medals were awarded to Kim Min-ju of South Korea and Emma Krapu of Finland.

== Schedule ==
All times are Central European Time (UTC+1)

Date	Time	Event
25 July 2015	10:00	Preliminary Rounds
25 July 2015	17:00	Final Block

== Results ==
Athletes advanced through direct knockout rounds—including the round of 32, round of 16, quarterfinals, and semifinals—to determine the two finalists fighting for the gold and silver medals. Parallel to the main bracket, a repechage system allowed defeated quarterfinalists to work their way back into the tournament, culminating in two separate bronze medal matches where the repechage winners faced the losing semifinalists.

Round of 32
M Sugimura (JPN)	100 (yellow card)
A Kazakova (UKR)	000
A Vizoso (ESP)	100
Wang Ch (TPE)	000
S Kolar (SLO)	000
P Iudina (AIN)	100

Round of 16
A Olek (GER)	100
M Sugimura (JPN)	000
I Narang (IND)	000
V Verschaere (BEL)	110
K Issoufi (FRA)	101
N Amirli (AZE)	000 (yellow card)
M Kuchimova (UZB)	000
A Vizoso (ESP)	101 (yellow card)
Kim Mj (KOR)	020
S Beberian (USA)	000
E Krapu (FIN)	100
S Ademola (NGR)	000
B Freitas (BRA)	100 (yellow card)
P Iudina (AIN)	000
N Sági (HUN)	001
B Moreira (POR)	000

Quarter-finals
A Olek (GER)	010 (yellow card)
V Verschaere (BEL)	000 (yellow card)
K Issoufi (FRA)	100
A Vizoso (ESP)	000
Kim Mj (KOR)	101 (yellow card)
E Krapu (FIN)	001
B Freitas (BRA)	100
N Sági (HUN)	000

Semi-finals
A Olek (GER)	100
K Issoufi (FRA)	001
Kim Mj (KOR)	000
B Freitas (BRA)	100 (yellow card)

Final
A Olek (GER)	020
B Freitas (BRA)	000

Repechage Phases

Repechage
V Verschaere (BEL)	101 (yellow card)
A Vizoso (ESP)	000
E Krapu (FIN)	100
N Sági (HUN)	000 (yellow card)

Bronze medal
V Verschaere (BEL)	000
Kim Mj (KOR)	001 (yellow card)
E Krapu (FIN)	110
K Issoufi (FRA)	012
