= Diving at the 2025 Summer World University Games – Women's 10 metre platform =

Women's 10 metre platform at the 2025 Summer World University Games
- Venue: Schwimm- und Sprunghalle im Europasportpark
- Location: Berlin
- Dates: 19 July (preliminary); 20 July (final)
- Competitors: 16 from 8 nations

Medalists
gold medal	Lu Wei	China
silver medal	Wang Weiying	China
bronze medal	Pauline Pfeif	Germany

The women's 10 metre platform at the 2025 Summer World University Games in Rhine-Ruhr, Germany was held from 19 to 20 July 2025. The gold medal was won by Lu Wei (China), the silver medal by Wang Weiying (China) and the bronze medal by Pauline Pfeif (Germany).

== Schedule ==
All times are Central European Time (UTC+1)

Date	Time	Round
19 July 2025	11:25	Preliminary
20 July 2025	16:10	Final

== Results ==
16 divers entered the event, representing 8 nations. A maximum of two players per nation advanced to the final.

Rank	Name	Nation	Preliminary		Final					
Rank	Name	Nation	Score	Rank	Dive 1	Dive 2	Dive 3	Dive 4	Dive 5	Total
1st place, gold medalist(s)	Lu Wei	China	324.75	3	75.00	75.20	87.45	89.10	73.60	400.35
2nd place, silver medalist(s)	Wang Weiying	China	337.00	2	76.50	76.80	78.00	74.25	81.60	387.15
3rd place, bronze medalist(s)	Pauline Pfeif	Germany	347.15	1	72.00	74.60	72.00	69.60	67.20	354.40
4	Sophia McAfee	United States	298.65	4	63.00	56.00	63.00	68.15	72.00	322.15
5	Carolina Coordes	Germany	270.60	6	57.60	48.00	65.25	60.00	62.40	293.25
6	Taylor Fox	United States	259.40	7	64.00	50.75	49.50	61.60	28.80	254.65
7	Kim Na-hyun	South Korea	237.20	13	56.55	48.00	54.60	36.00	59.20	254.35
8	Towa Norimatsu	Japan	253.30	8	49.60	57.40	47.60	40.50	57.60	252.70
9	Kim Seo-yeon	South Korea	248.10	9	54.60	49.30	46.20	42.00	47.85	239.95
10	Hannah Smith	Australia	234.80	14	36.00	52.80	29.40	54.40	41.60	214.20
11	Uliana Manaenkova	Individual Neutral Athletes	241.60	12	35.10	44.55	36.40	46.40	42.00	204.45
12	Karen Yamasaki	Japan	247.05	10	52.50	57.60	36.40	0.00	49.30	195.80
13	He Yanwei	China	290.75	5	Did not advance					
14	Kayleigh Clark	United States	243.80	11	Did not advance					
15	Kim Seung-hyun	South Korea	198.95	15	Did not advance					
16	Heloá Camelo	Brazil	198.10	16	Did not advance					
