= Pauline Pfeif =

German diver (born 2002)

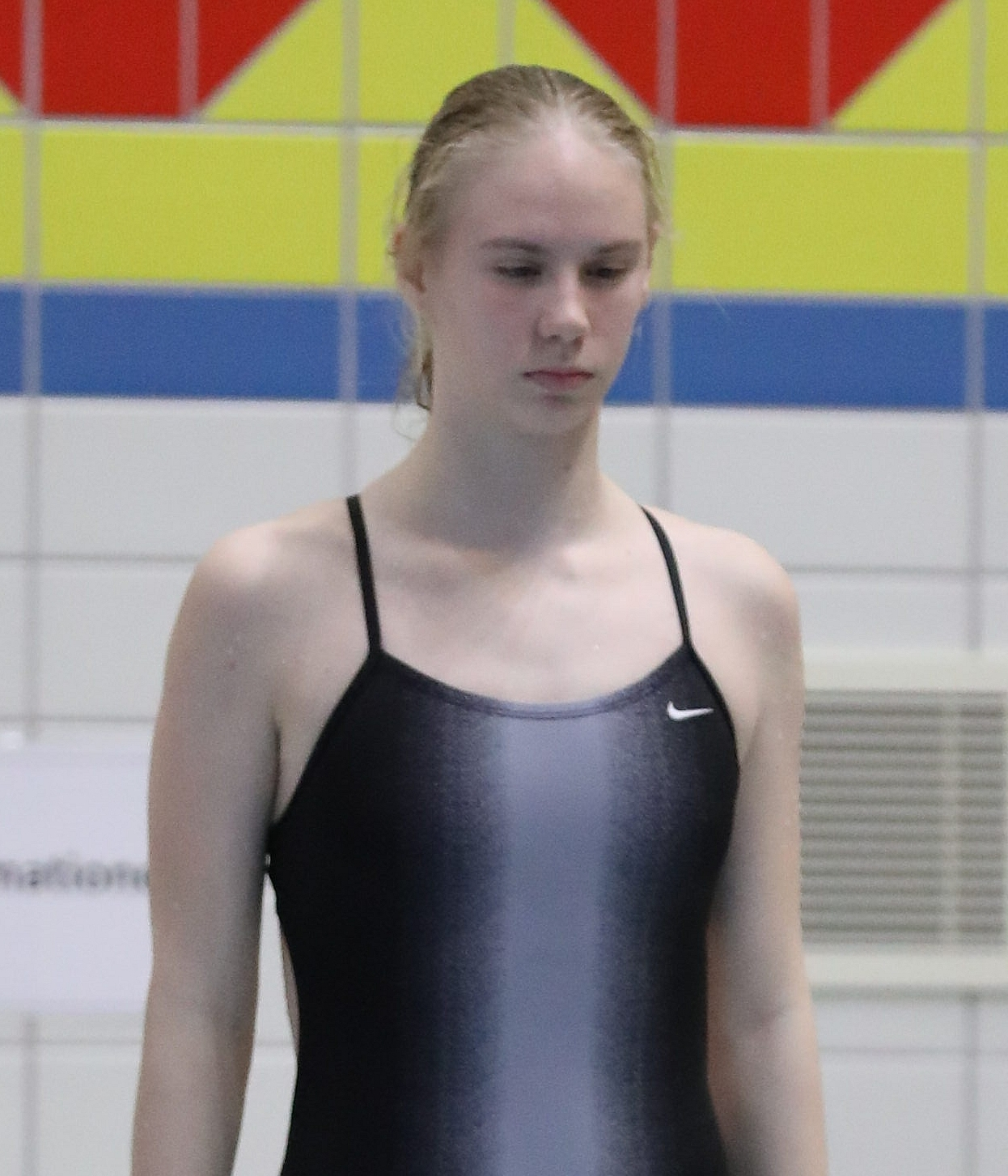
- Pfeif in 2019

Personal information
- Full name: Pauline Alexandra Pfeif
- Nationality: German
- Born: 7 May 2002 (age 24) Berlin, Germany

Sport
- Country: Germany
- Sport: Diving
Medal record
Women's diving
Representing Germany
World Championships
Silver medal – second place	2025 Singapore	10 m platform
European Aquatics Championships
Silver medal – second place	2026 Paris	10 m synchro
Silver medal – second place	2026 Paris	10 m platform
Silver medal – second place	2026 Paris	10 m mixed synchro
European Diving Championships
Silver medal – second place	2025 Antalya	10 m platform
Silver medal – second place	2025 Antalya	Mixed team
Bronze medal – third place	2025 Antalya	10 m synchro
Bronze medal – third place	2025 Antalya	10 m mixed synchro
World University Games
Gold medal – first place	2025 Rhine-Ruhr	Mixed team
Silver medal – second place	2025 Rhine-Ruhr	10 m synchro
Bronze medal – third place	2025 Rhine-Ruhr	10 m platform

Pauline Alexandra Pfeif (born 7 May 2002) is a German diver. She represented Germany at the 2024 Summer Olympics.

== Career ==
In May 2025, Pfeif competed at the 2025 European Diving Championships and won silver medals in the 10 metre platform and mixed team events, and bronze medals in the 10 metre synchro and 10 metre mixed synchro events. In July 2025, she competed at the 2025 Summer World University Games and won gold in the mixed team, silver in the 10 metre synchro and bronze in the 10 metre platform events. Weeks later she competed at the 2025 World Aquatics Championships and won a silver medal in the 10 metre platform event with a score of 367.10.

In August 2026, she competed at the 2026 European Aquatics Championships and won a silver medal in the 10 metre platform event with a score of 305.30 points. She also won silver medals in the 10 metre synchro event, along with Elena Wassen, and the 10 metre mixed synchro event, along with Ole Rösler.
