= Kim Herkle =

German swimmer

Personal information
- Nationality: German
- Born: 5 January 2003 (age 23) Stuttgart, Germany

Sport
- Sport: Swimming
- Club: Louisville Cardinals

Kim Herkle (born 5 January 2003) is a German swimmer. She competed in the women's 200 metre breaststroke event at the 2020 European Aquatics Championships, in Budapest, Hungary.

Herkle joined the University of Louisville Cardinals swim team in 2021. She is majoring in psychology.
