= Sweden at the 2025 Summer World University Games =

- Flag of Sweden
- IOC code: SWE
- National federation: Sveriges Akademiska Idrottsförbund

in Rhine-Ruhr, Germany 16 July 2025 – 27 July 2025
- Competitors: 52 in 7 sports
- Medals Ranked 33rd: Gold 1 Silver 1 Bronze 1 Total 3

Summer World University Games appearances
- 1959; 1961; 1963; 1965; 1967; 1970; 1973; 1975; 1977; 1979; 1981; 1983; 1985; 1987; 1989; 1991; 1993; 1995; 1997; 1999; 2001; 2003; 2005; 2007; 2009; 2011; 2013; 2015; 2017; 2019; 2021; 2025; 2027

Sweden competed at the 2025 Summer World University Games in Rhine-Ruhr, Germany held from 16 to 27 July 2025. Sweden was represented by 52 athletes and took thirty-third place in the medal table with three medals.

== Medal summary ==
=== Medal by sports ===
Rank	Sports	Gold	Silver	Bronze	Total
1	Athletics	1	1	0	2
2	Tennis	0	0	1	1
Totals (2 entries)		1	1	1	3

Source: rhineruhr2025.com

=== Medalists ===
Medal	Name	Sport	Event	Date
Gold	Axelina Johansson	Athletics	Women's shot put	22 July
Silver	Caisa-Marie Lindfors	Athletics	Women's discus throw	24 July
Bronze	John Gabelic; Nikola Slavic	Tennis	Men's doubles	23 July
