= New Zealand at the 2025 Summer World University Games =

- Flag of New Zealand
- IOC code: NZL
- National federation: University and Tertiary Sport New Zealand

in Rhine-Ruhr, Germany 16 July 2025 – 27 July 2025
- Competitors: 84 in 10 sports
- Flag bearers: Havana Hopman (rhythmic gymnastics); Josef Schuler (water polo)
- Medals Ranked 53rd: Gold 0 Silver 0 Bronze 2 Total 2

Summer World University Games appearances
- 1959; 1961; 1963; 1965; 1967; 1970; 1973; 1975; 1977; 1979; 1981; 1983; 1985; 1987; 1989; 1991; 1993; 1995; 1997; 1999; 2001; 2003; 2005; 2007; 2009; 2011; 2013; 2015; 2017; 2019; 2021; 2025; 2027

New Zealand competed at the 2025 Summer World University Games in Rhine-Ruhr, Germany. held from 16 to 27 July 2025. New Zealand was represented by 84 athletes and took fifty-third place in the medal table with two medals. Havana Hopman (rhythmic gymnastics) and Josef Schuler (water polo) were a flag bearers at the opening ceremony.

== Medal summary ==
=== Medal by sports ===
Rank	Sports	Gold	Silver	Bronze	Total
1	Athletics	0	0	1	1
1	Rowing	0	0	1	1
Totals (2 entries)		0	0	2	2

Source: rhineruhr2025.com

=== Medalists ===
Medal	Name	Sport	Event	Date
Bronze	Kimberley May	Athletics	Women's 1500m	27 July
Bronze	Frances Casey; Isobel Eliadis-Watson	Rowing	Women's pair	27 July
