= Lithuania at the 2025 Summer World University Games =

- Flag of Lithuania
- IOC code: LTU
- National federation: Lithuanian Students’ Sports Association

in Rhine-Ruhr, Germany 16 July 2025 – 27 July 2025
- Competitors: 57 in 9 sports
- Flag bearer: Gabrieliui Čelkai (basketball)
- Medals Ranked 19th: Gold 3 Silver 0 Bronze 4 Total 7

Summer World University Games appearances
- 1959; 1961; 1963; 1965; 1967; 1970; 1973; 1975; 1977; 1979; 1981; 1983; 1985; 1987; 1989; 1991; 1993; 1995; 1997; 1999; 2001; 2003; 2005; 2007; 2009; 2011; 2013; 2015; 2017; 2019; 2021; 2025; 2027

Lithuania competed at the 2025 Summer World University Games in Rhine-Ruhr, Germany held from 16 to 27 July 2025. Lithuania was represented by 57 athletes and took nineteenth place in the medal table with seven medals. Gabrieliui Čelkai was a flag bearer at the opening ceremony.

== Medal summary ==
=== Medal by sports ===
Rank	Sports	Gold	Silver	Bronze	Total
1	Rowing	2	0	2	4
2	3x3 basketball	1	0	0	1
3	Basketball	0	0	1	1
3	Swimming	0	0	1	1
Totals (4 entries)		3	0	4	7

Source: rhineruhr2025.com

=== Medalists ===
Medal	Name	Sport	Event	Date
Gold	Rokas Jocys; Augustinas Mikštas; Titas Januševičius; Gabrielius Čelka	3x3 basketball	Men	20 July
Gold	Kamilė Kralikaitė; Ugnė Juzėnaitė	Rowing	Women's pair	27 July
Gold	Domantas Stankūnas; Dovydas Stankūnas	Rowing	Men's pair	27 July
Bronze	Jokubas Keblys	Swimming	Men's 50m freestyle	23 July
Bronze	G Leščiauskas; D Stenionis; M Kancleris; J Sirtautas; K Keinys; M Repšys / M Mockus; M Mačijauskas; N Kulieša; M Sabaliauskas; A Plintauskas; G Nemeikša	Basketball	Men	26 July
Bronze	Arnedas Kelmelis	Rowing	Men's single sculls	27 July
Bronze	Ugnė Šakickaitė; Agnė Kubaitytė; Rokas Jakubauskas; Justas Kuskevičius	Rowing	Mixed quadruple sculls	27 July
