= Archery at the 2025 Summer World University Games – Men's individual compound =

Men's individual compound at the 2025 Summer World University Games
- Venue: Sportpark am Hallo (qualification); Zollverein Coal Mine Industrial Complex (finals)
- Location: Essen, Germany
- Dates: 22 – 26 July 2025
- Competitors: 86

Medalists
gold medal	Sahil Rajesh Jadhav	India
silver medal	Ajay Scott	Great Britain
bronze medal	Przemyslaw Konecki	Poland

The men's individual compound archery competition at the 2025 Summer World University Games was held at the Sportpark am Hallo and the Zollverein Coal Mine Industrial Complex in Essen, Germany from 22 to 26 July 2025.

== Records ==
Prior to the competition, the world and Universiade records were as follows.

- 72 arrows ranking round

Category	Athlete	Record	Date	Place	Event
World record	(United States) Braden Gellenthien	718	13 July 2016	Decatur, USA	
Universiade record	(South Korea) Kim Jong-ho	716	9 July 2019	Naples, Italy	2019 Summer Universiade

== Ranking round ==
The ranking round was held on 22 July 2025 to determine the seeding for the elimination rounds. It consisted of two rounds of 36 arrows, with a maximum score of 720.

Qualified for 1/16 Round
Qualified for 1/24 Round
Qualified for 1/48 Round

Rank	Archer	10s	Xs	Score
1	Seung-hyun Park (KOR)	59	20	707
2	Kushal Dalal (IND)	59	32	706
3	Ivan Zhulin (AIN)	57	26	705
4	Ajay Scott (GBR)	57	26	704
5	Shamai Yamrom (ISR)	55	26	702
6	Sahil Rajesh Jadhav (IND)	51	28	699
7	Ruven Flüss (GER)	51	23	697
8	Wu Z Wei (TPE)	51	27	696
9	Paolo Kunsch (GER)	51	18	696
10	Batuhan Akçaoğlu (TUR)	49	22	696
11	Aljas Matija Brenk (SLO)	48	16	695
12	Lee Eun Ho (KOR)	48	23	694
13	Hritik Sharma (IND)	48	19	694
14	Colton Green (USA)	46	20	694
15	Yunus Emre Arslan (TUR)	47	25	693
16	Vitalii Vdovenko (UKR)	47	23	693
17	Przemyslaw Konecki (POL)	46	19	693
18	Lin Han Ting (TPE)	46	16	693
19	Finlay Clark (GBR)	52	24	692
20	François Dubois (FRA)	47	14	692
21	Andrea Marchetti (ITA)	44	14	692
22	Antonio Brunelli (ITA)	47	19	691
23	Jay Tjin-A-Djie (NED)	45	19	691
24	Muhammad Nur Norwafi (MAS)	44	14	690
25	Andrey Tyutyun (KAZ)	43	18	690
26	Yakup Yildiz (TUR)	42	13	690
27	Jin Le Huang (TPE)	44	23	689
28	Kim Sungchul (KOR)	44	21	689
29	Mohammad Syafiq Md Ariffin (MAS)	45	15	688
30	Roberto Sottile (ITA)	43	21	688
31	Victor Bouleau (FRA)	46	18	686
32	Hercules Albertus Aucamp (RSA)	45	24	686
33	Hou Shenglin (CHN)	44	16	686
34	Gergo Elekes (HUN)	42	19	685
35	Ryan Booth (USA)	42	20	684
36	Li Jinpeng (CHN)	40	20	681
37	Tanco Wesley Joshua (PHI)	39	14	681
38	Ban Takuma (JPN)	37	12	680
39	Nabil Thaqif Bin Saharuddin (MAS)	37	14	679
40	Mihael Curic (CRO)	36	15	678
41	Jonathan Gräfe (GER)	38	13	677
42	Rogan Cunningham (IRL)	34	10	677
43	Jelle Reule (NED)	38	14	676
44	Eduard Szekely (ROU)	35	23	676
45	Yansong Chen (CHN)	35	12	676
46	Rares Daniel Alexandrescu (ROU)	34	12	676
47	Juan Pablo Silva Piñon (MEX)	36	15	675
48	Karpenko Sviatoslav (UKR)	34	13	675
49	Mihovil Srebren (CRO)	35	8	674
50	Idnus de Wet (RSA)	34	10	674
51	Yegor Poluyakov (KAZ)	37	14	673
52	Sandu Gabriel (ROU)	34	12	673
53	Sam Delaney (IRL)	32	12	673
54	Nedelko Daniil (UKR)	33	13	671
55	Trevor Hoy (CAN)	32	11	671
56	David Hryhoryev (POR)	36	10	670
57	Lovro Rusnjak (CRO)	33	13	670
58	Ngai Ho Chun Justin (HKG)	30	8	670
59	Dilmukhamet Mussa (KAZ)	35	10	668
60	Fionn Roche (IRL)	29	11	663
61	Turner Nevitt (USA)	28	11	662
62	Damian Tempelman (NED)	27	8	661
63	Lim Jing Hng Conan (SGP)	27	10	658
64	Ong Rui Peng Davin (SGP)	22	10	646

== Elimination stage ==
=== Section 1 ===
1/48 elimination round
49	Mihovil Srebren (CRO)	134
64	Ong Rui Peng Davin (SGP)	142

1/24 elimination round
33	Hou Shenglin (CHN)	142^{10+}
32	Hercules Albertus Aucamp (RSA)	142^{10}
17	Przemyslaw Konecki (POL)	143
48	Karpenko Sviatoslav (UKR)	141
64	Ong Rui Peng Davin (SGP)	141
16	Vitalii Vdovenko (UKR)	143

Round of 32
1	Seung-hyun Park (KOR)	144
33	Hou Shenglin (CHN)	148
17	Przemyslaw Konecki (POL)	143
16	Vitalii Vdovenko (UKR)	140

Round of 16
33	Hou Shenglin (CHN)	141
17	Przemyslaw Konecki (POL)	146

=== Section 2 ===
1/48 elimination round
57	Lovro Rusnjak (CRO)	138
56	David Hryhoryev (POR)	140

1/24 elimination round
9	Paolo Kunsch (GER)	147
56	David Hryhoryev (POR)	136
41	Jonathan Gräfe (GER)	140
24	Muhammad Nur Norwafi (MAS)	139
25	Andrey Tyutyun (KAZ)	146
40	Mihael Curic (CRO)	144

Round of 32
9	Paolo Kunsch (GER)	144
41	Jonathan Gräfe (GER)	137
25	Andrey Tyutyun (KAZ)	145
8	Wu Z Wei (TPE)	144

Round of 16
9	Paolo Kunsch (GER)	145^{9}
25	Andrey Tyutyun (KAZ)	145^{10}

=== Section 3 ===
1/48 elimination round
53	Sam Delaney (IRL)	140
60	Fionn Roche (IRL)	141

1/24 elimination round
37	Tanco Wesley Joshua (PHI)	142
28	Kim Sungchul (KOR)	139
21	Andrea Marchetti (ITA)	141
44	Eduard Szekely (ROU)	144
60	Fionn Roche (IRL)	135
12	Lee Eun-ho (KOR)	147

Round of 32
5	Shamai Yamrom (ISR)	145
37	Tanco Wesley Joshua (PHI)	138
44	Eduard Szekely (ROU)	142
12	Lee Eun-ho (KOR)	143

Round of 16
5	Shamai Yamrom (ISR)	143^{10}
12	Lee Eun-ho (KOR)	143^{10+}

=== Section 4 ===
1/48 elimination round
61	Turner Nevitt (USA)	145
52	Sandu Gabriel (ROU)	143

1/24 elimination round
13	Hritik Sharma (IND)	146
61	Turner Nevitt (USA)	140
45	Yansong Chen (CHN)	140
20	François Dubois (FRA)	147
29	Mohammad Syafiq Md Ariffin (MAS)	145
36	Li Jinpeng (CHN)	141

Round of 32
13	Hritik Sharma (IND)	143
20	François Dubois (FRA)	146
29	Mohammad Syafiq Md Ariffin (MAS)	144
4	Ajay Scott (GBR)	145

Round of 16
20	François Dubois (FRA)	147^{10}
4	Ajay Scott (GBR)	147^{10+}

=== Section 5 ===
1/48 elimination round
51	Yegor Poluyakov (KAZ)	146
62	Damian Tempelman (NED)	141

1/24 elimination round
35	Ryan Booth (USA)	147
30	Roberto Sottile (ITA)	142
19	Finlay Clark (GBR)	145
46	Rares Daniel Alexandrescu (ROU)	142
51	Yegor Poluyakov (KAZ)	145
14	Colton Green (USA)	146

Round of 32
3	Ivan Zhulin (AIN)	144
35	Ryan Booth (USA)	142
19	Finlay Clark (GBR)	144^{10+}
14	Colton Green (USA)	144^{10}

Round of 16
3	Ivan Zhulin (AIN)	142
19	Finlay Clark (GBR)	146

=== Section 6 ===
1/48 elimination round
59	Dilmukhamet Mussa (KAZ)	139
54	Nedelko Daniil (UKR)	140

1/24 elimination round
11	Aljas Matija Brenk (SLO)	142
54	Nedelko Daniil (UKR)	136
43	Jelle Reule (NED)	143
22	Antonio Brunelli (ITA)	141
27	Jin Le Huang (TPE)	143
38	Ban Takuma (JPN)	142

Round of 32
11	Aljas Matija Brenk (SLO)	146
43	Jelle Reule (NED)	140
27	Jin Le Huang (TPE)	143
6	Sahil Rajesh Jadhav (IND)	145

Round of 16
11	Aljas Matija Brenk (SLO)	147
6	Sahil Rajesh Jadhav (IND)	148

=== Section 7 ===
1/48 elimination round
55	Trevor Hoy (CAN)	139
58	Ngai Ho Chun Justin (HKG)	136

1/24 elimination round
39	Nabil Thaqif Bin Saharuddin (MAS)	138
26	Yakup Yildiz (TUR)	147
23	Jay Tjin-A-Djie (NED)	145
42	Rogan Cunningham (IRL)	141
55	Trevor Hoy (CAN)	139
10	Batuhan Akçaoğlu (TUR)	148

Round of 32
7	Ruven Flüss (GER)	145
26	Yakup Yildiz (TUR)	143
23	Jay Tjin-A-Djie (NED)	143
10	Batuhan Akçaoğlu (TUR)	149

Round of 16
7	Ruven Flüss (GER)	145^{10+}
10	Batuhan Akçaoğlu (TUR)	145^{10}

=== Section 8 ===
1/48 elimination round
63	Lim Jing Hng Conan (SGP)	140^{10}
50	Idnus de Wet (RSA)	140^{9}

1/24 elimination round
15	Yunus Emre Arslan (TUR)	148
63	Lim Jing Hng Conan (SGP)	136
47	Juan Pablo Silva Piñon (MEX)	142
18	Lin Han Ting (TPE)	144
31	Victor Bouleau (FRA)	146
34	Gergo Elekes (HUN)	142

Round of 32
15	Yunus Emre Arslan (TUR)	147
18	Lin Han Ting (TPE)	145
31	Victor Bouleau (FRA)	147
2	Kushal Dalal (IND)	148

Round of 16
15	Yunus Emre Arslan (TUR)	148^{9}
2	Kushal Dalal (IND)	148^{10}

=== Finals ===
Quarter-finals
17	Przemyslaw Konecki (POL)	148
25	Andrey Tyutyun (KAZ)	143
12	Lee Eun Ho (KOR)	146
4	Ajay Scott (GBR)	148
19	Finlay Clark (GBR)	142
6	Sahil Rajesh Jadhav (IND)	146
7	Ruven Flüss (GER)	146
2	Kushal Dalal (IND)	148

Semi-finals
17	Przemyslaw Konecki (POL)	145
4	Ajay Scott (GBR)	148
6	Sahil Rajesh Jadhav (IND)	148^{10+}
2	Kushal Dalal (IND)	148^{10}

Gold medal match
4	Ajay Scott (GBR)	148
6	Sahil Rajesh Jadhav (IND)	149
Bronze medal match
17	Przemyslaw Konecki (POL)	150 GR
2	Kushal Dalal (IND)	148
