= Archery at the 2025 Summer World University Games – Men's team compound =

Men's team compound at the 2025 Summer World University Games
- Venue: Sportpark am Hallo (qualification); Zollverein Coal Mine Industrial Complex (finals)
- Location: Essen, Germany
- Dates: 22 – 25 July 2025
- Competitors: 15 from 45 nations

Medalists
gold medal	Batuhan Akçaoğlu; Yakup Yıldız; Yunus Emre Arslan	Turkey
silver medal	Kushal Dalal; Hritik Sharma; Sahil Jadhav	India
bronze medal	Kim Sung-chul; Lee Eun-ho; Park Seung-hyun	South Korea

The men's team compound archery competition at the 2025 Summer World University Games was held at the Sportpark am Hallo and the Zollverein Coal Mine Industrial Complex in Essen, Germany from 22 to 25 July 2025.

== Records ==
Prior to the competition, the world and Universiade records were as follows.

- 216 arrows ranking round

Category	Team	Athlete	Record	Date	Place	Event
World record	United States	Braden Gellenthien	2140	18 April 2023	Antalya, Turkey	World Cup
World record	United States	James Lutz	2140	18 April 2023	Antalya, Turkey	World Cup
World record	United States	Sawyer Sullivan	2140	18 April 2023	Antalya, Turkey	World Cup
Universiade record	South Korea (KOR)	Kim Jong-ho	2102	4 July 2015	Gwangju, South Korea	2015 Summer Universiade
Universiade record	South Korea (KOR)	Kim Tae-yoon	2102	4 July 2015	Gwangju, South Korea	2015 Summer Universiade
Universiade record	South Korea (KOR)	Yang Young-ho	2102	4 July 2015	Gwangju, South Korea	2015 Summer Universiade

== Qualification round ==
The ranking round took place on 22 July 2025 to determine the seeding for the elimination rounds. It consisted of two rounds of 216 arrows, with a maximum score of 2160.

Qualified for 1/8 Round
Qualified for Quarterfinals

Rank	Team	Archers	Individual			Team		
Rank	Team	Archers	Total	10s	Xs	Total	10s	Xs
1	India	Kushal Dalal	706	59	32	2099	158	79
1	India	Sahil Jadhav	699	51	28	2099	158	79
1	India	Hritik Sharma	694	48	19	2099	158	79
2	South Korea	Kim Sung-chul	689	44	21	2090	151	64
2	South Korea	Lee Eun-ho	694	48	23	2090	151	64
2	South Korea	Park Seung-hyun	707	59	20	2090	151	64
3	Turkey	Batuhan Akcaoglu	696	49	22	2079	138	60
3	Turkey	Yunus Emre Arslan	693	47	25	2079	138	60
3	Turkey	Yakup Yildiz	690	42	13	2079	138	60
4	Chinese Taipei	Huang Jin-le	689	44	23	2078	141	66
4	Chinese Taipei	Lin Han-ting	693	46	16	2078	141	66
4	Chinese Taipei	Wu Z-wei	696	51	27	2078	141	66
5	Italy	Antonio Brunello	691	47	19	2071	134	54
5	Italy	Andrea Marchetti	692	44	14	2071	134	54
5	Italy	Roberto Sottile	688	43	21	2071	134	54
6	Germany	Ruven Flüss	697	51	23	2070	140	54
6	Germany	Jonathan Gräfe	677	38	13	2070	140	54
6	Germany	Paolo Kunsch	696	51	18	2070	140	54
7	Malaysia	Syafiq Ariffin	688	45	15	2057	126	43
7	Malaysia	Azimi Norwafi	690	44	14	2057	126	43
7	Malaysia	Nabil Thaqif	679	37	14	2057	126	43
8	China	Chen Yansong	676	35	12	2043	119	48
8	China	Hou Shenglin	686	44	16	2043	119	48
8	China	Li Jinpeng	681	40	20	2043	119	48
9	United States	Ryan Booth	684	42	20	2040	116	51
9	United States	Colton Green	694	46	20	2040	116	51
9	United States	Turner Nevitt	662	28	11	2040	116	51
10	Ukraine	Sviatoslav Karpenko	675	34	13	2039	114	49
10	Ukraine	Daniil Nedelko	671	33	13	2039	114	49
10	Ukraine	Vitalii Vdovenko	693	47	23	2039	114	49
11	Kazakhstan	Dilmukhamet Mussa	668	35	10	2031	115	42
11	Kazakhstan	Yegor Polyakov	673	37	14	2031	115	42
11	Kazakhstan	Andrey Tyutyun	690	43	18	2031	115	42
12	Netherlands	Jelle Reule	676	38	14	2028	110	41
12	Netherlands	Damian Tempelman	661	27	8	2028	110	41
12	Netherlands	Jay Tjin-A-Djie	691	45	19	2028	110	41
13	Romania	Rareș Alexandrescu	676	34	12	2025	103	47
13	Romania	Gabriel Sandu	673	34	12	2025	103	47
13	Romania	Eduard Szekely	676	35	23	2025	103	47
14	Croatia	Mihael Curić	678	36	15	2022	104	36
14	Croatia	Lovro Rusnjak	670	33	13	2022	104	36
14	Croatia	Mihovil Srebren	674	35	8	2022	104	36
15	Ireland	Rogan Cunningham	677	34	10	2013	95	33
15	Ireland	Sam Delaney	673	32	12	2013	95	33
15	Ireland	Fionn Roche	663	29	11	2013	95	33

== Elimination round ==
The results are as below.

1/8 finals
9	United States	229^{29+}
8	China	229^{29}
5	Italy	231
12	Netherlands	225
13	Romania	232
4	Chinese Taipei	236
3	Turkey	229
14	Croatia	227
11	Kazakhstan	226
6	Germany	233
7	Malaysia	234
10	Ukraine	229
15	Ireland	227
2	South Korea	236

Quarterfinals
1	India	236
9	United States	229
5	Italy	225
4	Chinese Taipei	233
3	Turkey	236
6	Germany	225
7	Malaysia	233
2	South Korea	235

Semifinals
1	India	235
4	Chinese Taipei	233
3	Turkey	236
2	South Korea	235

Final
1	India	231
3	Turkey	232
Bronze medal match
4	Chinese Taipei	233
2	South Korea	236
