= Archery at the 2025 Summer World University Games – Women's individual compound =

Women's individual at the 2025 Summer World University Games
- Venue: Sportpark am Hallo (qualification); Zollverein Coal Mine Industrial Complex (finals)
- Location: Essen, Germany
- Dates: 22 – 26 July 2025
- Competitors: 51 from 25 nations

Medalists
gold medal	Moon Ye-eun	South Korea
silver medal	Parneet Kaur	India
bronze medal	Park Ye-rin	South Korea

The women's individual compound archery competition at the 2025 Summer World University Games was held at the Sportpark am Hallo and the Zollverein Coal Mine Industrial Complex in Essen, Germany from 22 to 26 July 2025.

== Records ==
Prior to the competition, the world and Universiade records were as follows.

- 72 arrows ranking round

Category	Athlete	Record	Date	Place	Event
World record	(United Kingdom) Ella Gibson	718	14 July 2024	Wisley, England	Domestic event
Universiade record	(Turkey) Yeşim Bostan	701	9 July 2019	Naples, Italy	2019 Summer Universiade
Universiade record	(South Africa) Danelle Wentzel-Lutz	701	9 July 2019	Naples, Italy	2019 Summer Universiade

== Qualification round ==
The ranking round took place on 22 July 2025 to determine the seeding for the elimination rounds. It consisted of two rounds of 72 arrows, with a maximum score of 720.

Qualified for 1/12 Round
Qualified for 1/24 Round

Rank	Athlete	50m-1	50m-2	10+X	X	Score
1	Parneet Kaur (IND)	355	346	53	13	701
2	Park Ye-rin (KOR)	353	347	55	21	700
3	Moon Ye-eun (KOR)	349	346	50	20	695
4	Arina Cherkezova (AIN)	346	347	48	17	693
5	Kim Soo-yeon (KOR)	344	345	44	17	689
6	Madhura Dhamangaonkar (IND)	340	347	42	13	687
7	Amanda Mlinarić (CRO)	346	341	41	14	687
8	Chen Si-yu (TPE)	343	342	38	13	685
9	Léa Girault (FRA)	339	345	44	18	684
10	Danielle Woodie (USA)	342	340	39	19	682
11	Hazal Burun (TUR)	342	339	38	20	681
12	Roxana Yunussova (KAZ)	336	344	39	13	680
13	Sydney Sullenberger (USA)	342	338	37	16	680
14	Leann Drake (USA)	342	337	39	13	679
15	Olha Khomutovska (UKR)	339	338	39	8	677
16	Ellie Low (SGP)	336	341	33	13	677
17	Francesca Aloisi (ITA)	339	338	33	10	677
18	Hallie Boulton (GBR)	340	336	40	12	676
19	Chloe A'Bear (GBR)	336	339	35	10	675
20	Grace Chappell (GBR)	336	338	36	15	674
21	Elmira Raissova (KAZ)	334	340	35	15	674
22	Avneet Kaur (IND)	341	332	38	17	673
23	Lin Yu-fan (TPE)	328	342	31	18	670
24	Martina Zikmundová (CZE)	335	334	32	12	669
25	Alyssia Chambraud (FRA)	338	331	32	10	669
26	Andrea Moccia (ITA)	337	332	27	12	669
27	Chiu Yu-erh (TPE)	332	336	33	12	668
28	Natasha Shahruddin (MAS)	332	336	30	10	668
29	Giselle de Sousa (POR)	332	334	30	12	666
30	Ylva Hjelle (NOR)	334	328	35	11	662
31	Viktoriia Kardash (UKR)	332	326	30	14	658
32	Aizhan Seidakhmetova (KAZ)	329	329	24	9	658
33	Miranda Cisneros (MEX)	327	330	25	9	657
34	Syaza Mahari (MAS)	326	327	27	9	653
35	Lily Azli (AUS)	325	328	24	11	653
36	Alma Ifergan (ISR)	327	326	24	5	653
37	Jyotsna Challa (CAN)	328	324	23	6	652
38	Elisa Bazzichetto (ITA)	313	338	34	15	651
39	Carissa Min (SGP)	323	322	25	9	645
40	Mia Međimurec (CRO)	325	320	25	6	645
41	Nisa Radzif (MAS)	330	314	24	7	644
42	Elena Topliceanu (ROU)	323	319	19	9	642
43	Lara Drobnjak (CRO)	312	328	17	6	640
44	Bernadett Haragoș (ROU)	312	318	15	8	630
45	Joane Coetzee (RSA)	305	322	20	6	627
46	Shannon Kei (SGP)	314	309	19	9	623
47	Kanon Asari (JPN)	311	308	12	4	619
48	Yelyzaveta Sushko (UKR)	310	308	22	5	618
49	Alexandra Creangă (ROU)	301	281	15	7	582
50	Sara Smajič (SLO)	286	294	9	4	580
51	Brynnleigh Lohner (CAN)	9	0	0	0	9

== Elimination round ==
The results are as below.

=== Section 1 ===
1/24 elimination round
33	Miranda Villa (MEX)	140
32	Aizhan Seidakhmetova (KAZ)	141
17	Francesca Aloisi (ITA)	141
48	Yelyzaveta Sushko (UKR)	131
49	Alexandra Creangă (ROU)	132
16	Ellie Low (SGP)	145
41	Nisa Radzif (MAS)	137
24	Martina Zikmundová (CZE)	144
25	Alyssia Chambraud (FRA)	144
40	Mia Međimurec (CRO)	140

1/16 elimination round
1	Parneet Kaur (IND)	146
32	Aizhan Seidakhmetova (KAZ)	145
17	Francesca Aloisi (ITA)	138
16	Ellie Low (SGP)	145
9	Léa Girault (FRA)	142
24	Martina Zikmundová (CZE)	141
25	Alyssia Chambraud (FRA)	143
8	Chen Si-yu (TPE)	137

1/8 elimination round
1	Parneet Kaur (IND)	148
16	Ellie Low (SGP)	144
9	Léa Girault (FRA)	141
25	Alyssia Chambraud (FRA)	144

Quarterfinals
1	Parneet Kaur (IND)	144
25	Alyssia Chambraud (FRA)	141

=== Section 2 ===
1/24 elimination round
37	Jyotsna Challa (CAN)	138
28	Natasha Shahruddin (MAS)	140
21	Elmira Raissova (KAZ)	143
44	Bernadett Haragoș (ROU)	136
45	Joane Coetzee (RSA)	135
20	Grace Chappell (GBR)	137
29	Giselle de Sousa (POR)	144
36	Alma Ifergan (ISR)	137

1/16 elimination round
5	Kim Soo-yeon (KOR)	147
28	Natasha Shahruddin (MAS)	138
21	Elmira Raissova (KAZ)	147
12	Roxana Yunussova (KAZ)	143
13	Sydney Sullenberger (USA)	145
20	Grace Chappell (GBR)	142
29	Giselle de Sousa (POR)	144^{9}
4	Arina Cherkezova (AIN)	144^{9+}

1/8 elimination round
5	Kim Soo-yeon (KOR)	141^{10+}
21	Elmira Raissova (KAZ)	141^{10}
13	Sydney Sullenberger (USA)	144
4	Arina Cherkezova (AIN)	142

Quarterfinals
5	Kim Soo-yeon (KOR)	144
13	Sydney Sullenberger (USA)	140

=== Section 3 ===
1/24 elimination round
35	Lily Azli (AUS)	136
30	Ylva Hjelle (NOR)	137
19	Chloe A'Bear (GBR)	140
46	Shannon Kei (SGP)	133
51	Brynnleigh Lohner (CAN)	DNS
14	Leann Drake (USA)
43	Lara Drobnjak (CRO)	139
22	Avneet Kaur (IND)	144
27	Chiu Yu-erh (TPE)	139
38	Elisa Bazzichetto (ITA)	140

1/16 elimination round
3	Moon Ye-eun (KOR)	146
30	Ylva Hjelle (NOR)	145
19	Chloe A'Bear (GBR)	143
14	Leann Drake (USA)	145
11	Hazal Burun (TUR)	144
22	Avneet Kaur (IND)	145
38	Elisa Bazzichetto (ITA)	142
6	Madhura Dhamangaonkar (IND)	143

1/8 elimination round
3	Moon Ye-eun (KOR)	143
14	Leann Drake (USA)	135
22	Avneet Kaur (IND)	145
6	Madhura Dhamangaonkar (IND)	142

Quarterfinals
3	Moon Ye-eun (KOR)	146
22	Avneet Kaur (IND)	140

=== Section 4 ===
1/24 elimination round
39	Carissa Goh (SGP)	138
26	Andrea Moccia (ITA)	147
23	Lin Yu-fan (TPE)	137
42	Elena Topliceanu (ROU)	140
15	Olha Khomutovska (UKR)	143
50	Sara Smajić (SLO)	119
47	Kanon Asari (JPN)	134
18	Hallie Boulton (GBR)	149
31	Viktoriia Kardash (UKR)	135
34	Syaza Mahari (MAS)	143

1/16 elimination round
7	Amanda Mlinarić (CRO)	144
26	Andrea Moccia (ITA)	145
42	Elena Topliceanu (ROU)	139
10	Danielle Woodie (USA)	142
15	Olha Khomutovska (UKR)	141
18	Hallie Boulton (GBR)	146
34	Syaza Mahari (MAS)	143
2	Park Ye-rin (KOR)	144

1/8 elimination round
26	Andrea Moccia (ITA)	143 (T. 10+)
10	Danielle Woodie (USA)	143 (T. 10)
18	Hallie Boulton (GBR)	143
2	Park Ye-rin (KOR)	145

Quarterfinals
26	Andrea Moccia (ITA)	142
2	Park Ye-rin (KOR)	145

=== Finals ===
Quarterfinals
1	Parneet Kaur (IND)	144
25	Alyssia Chambraud (FRA)	141
5	Kim Soo-yeon (KOR)	144
13	Sydney Sullenberger (USA)	140
3	Moon Ye-eun (KOR)	146
22	Avneet Kaur (IND)	140
26	Andrea Moccia (ITA)	142
2	Park Ye-rin (KOR)	145

Semifinals
1	Parneet Kaur (IND)	145
5	Kim Soo-yeon (KOR)	144
3	Moon Ye-eun (KOR)	144
2	Park Ye-rin (KOR)	143

Finals
1	Parneet Kaur (IND)	146
3	Moon Ye-eun (KOR)	147
Bronze medal match
5	Kim Soo-yeon (KOR)	146
2	Park Ye-rin (KOR)	147
