= Archery at the 2025 Summer World University Games – Mixed team compound =

Mixed team compound at the 2025 Summer World University Games
- Venue: Sportpark am Hallo (qualification); Zollverein Coal Mine Industrial Complex (finals)
- Location: Essen, Germany
- Dates: 22 – 26 July 2025
- Competitors: 42 from 21 nations

Medalists
gold medal	Parneet Kaur; Kushal Dalal	India
silver medal	Park Ye-rin; Park Seung-hyun	South Korea
bronze medal	Hallie Boulton; Ajay Scott	Great Britain

The mixed team compound archery competition at the 2025 Summer World University Games was held at the Sportpark am Hallo and the Zollverein Coal Mine Industrial Complex in Essen, Germany from 22 to 26 July 2025.

== Records ==
Prior to the competition, the world and Universiade records were as follows.

- 144 arrows ranking round

Category	Athlete	Record	Date	Place	Event
World record	Denmark; Tanja Gellenthien; Mathias Fullerton	1429	23 June 2023	Kraków, Poland	2023 European Games
Universiade record	South Korea; So Chae-won; Kim Jong-ho	1411	9 July 2019	Naples, Italy	2019 Summer Universiade

== Qualification round ==
The ranking round took place on 22 July 2025 to determine the seeding for the elimination rounds. It consisted of top archers' results in individual event, with a maximum score of 1440.

Rank	Team	Archer	Individual			Team		
Rank	Team	Archer	Score	10s	Xs	Total	10s	Xs
1	South Korea	Seung-hyun Park (M)	707	59	20	1407	114	41
1	South Korea	Park Yerin (F)	700	55	21	1407	114	41
2	India	Kushal Dalal (M)	706	59	32	1407	112	45
2	India	Parneet Kaur (F)	701	53	13	1407	112	45
3	Chinese Taipei	Wu Z Wei (M)	696	51	27	1381	89	40
3	Chinese Taipei	Si-yu Chen (F)	685	38	13	1381	89	40
4	Great Britain	Ajay Scott (M)	704	57	26	1380	97	38
4	Great Britain	Hallie Boulton (F)	676	40	12	1380	97	38
5	Turkey	Batuhan Akçaoğlu (M)	696	49	22	1377	87	42
5	Turkey	Hazal Burun (F)	681	38	20	1377	87	42
6	France	François Dubois (M)	692	47	14	1376	91	32
6	France	Lea Girault (F)	684	44	18	1376	91	32
7	United States	Colton Green (M)	694	46	20	1376	85	39
7	United States	Danielle Woodie (F)	682	39	19	1376	85	39
8	Iran	Reza Shabani	656	22	3	1370	82	31
8	Iran	Mobina Fallah	639	24	9	1370	82	31
9	Turkey	Samet Ak	660	28	12	1370	86	31
9	Turkey	Zeynep Köse	629	16	4	1370	86	31
10	Kazakhstan	Mansur Alimbayev	648	20	7	1369	77	24
10	Kazakhstan	Diana Tursunbek	634	21	5	1369	77	24
11	Hong Kong	Kwok Yin Chai	675	31	12	1365	77	29
11	Hong Kong	Poon Wei Tsing	597	6	1	1365	77	29
12	Poland	Maksymilian Osuch	651	21	8	1358	74	24
12	Poland	Sylwia Zyzańska	618	14	3	1358	74	24
13	Germany	Jonathan Vetter	629	21	8	1355	79	31
13	Germany	Johanna Klinger	630	15	5	1355	79	31
14	Malaysia	Mohd Rizuwan	636	16	5	1336	66	22
14	Malaysia	Nur Afisa Abdul Halil	614	9	3	1336	66	22
15	Ukraine	Stefan Kostyk	623	21	7	1335	60	23
15	Ukraine	Solomiya Trapeznikova	612	16	5	1335	60	23
16	United States	Christopher Austin	607	14	4	1332	61	24
16	United States	Judith Gottlieb	626	17	7	1332	61	24
17	Australia	Markus Kuhrau	609	15	7	1323	55	17
17	Australia	Imogen Grzemski	610	14	5	1323	55	17
18	Moldova	Dan Olaru	658	23	10	1318	54	32
18	Moldova	Nadejda Celan	529	8	4	1318	54	32
19	South Africa	Hercules Albertus Aucamp	686	45	24	1313	65	30
19	South Africa	Joane Coetzee	627	20	6	1313	65	30
20	Japan	Ban Takuma	680	37	12	1299	49	16
20	Japan	Asari Kanon	619	12	4	1299	49	16
21	Slovenia	Aljaz Matija Brenk	695	48	16	1275	57	20
21	Slovenia	Sara Smajic	580	9	4	1275	57	20

== Elimination round ==
The results are as below.

1/12 finals
17	Canada	145
16	Mexico	144
21	Slovenia	149
12	Malaysia	146
13	Israel	146^{19}
20	Japan	146^{18}
19	South Africa	145
14	Portugal	147
15	Singapore	150
18	Romania	144

1/8 finals
1	South Korea	159
17	Canada	146
9	Ukraine	151
8	Kazakhstan	155
5	Turkey	156
21	Slovenia	144
13	Israel	148
4	Great Britain	158
3	Chinese Taipei	154
14	Portugal	150
11	Croatia	154
6	France	155
7	United States	156
10	Italy	152
15	Singapore	153
2	India	158

Quarterfinals
1	South Korea	158
8	Kazakhstan	153
5	Turkey	154
4	Great Britain	158
3	Chinese Taipei	153^{20}
6	France	153^{19}
7	United States	157
2	India	158

Semifinals
1	South Korea	159
4	Great Britain	155
3	Chinese Taipei	151
2	India	158

Final
1	South Korea	154
2	India	157
Bronze medal match
4	Great Britain	153
3	Chinese Taipei	148
