= Archery at the 2025 Summer World University Games =

- Venue: Sportpark am Hallo (qualification); Zollverein Coal Mine Industrial Complex (finals)
- Dates: 22–26 July 2025
- Competitors: 185 from 52 nations

Archery took place at the 2025 Summer World University Games from 22 to 26 July 2025 at the Sportpark am Hallo and the Zollverein Coal Mine Industrial Complex in Essen, Germany.

== Medal table ==
Rank	Nation	Gold	Silver	Bronze	Total
1	South Korea	3	2	3	8
2	India	2	2	1	5
3	Japan	2	1	1	4
4	China	1	2	1	4
5	Chinese Taipei	1	1	0	2
6	Turkey	1	0	2	3
7	Great Britain	0	1	1	2
8	United States	0	1	0	1
9	Poland	0	0	1	1
Totals (9 entries)		10	10	10	30

== Medalists ==
=== Recurve ===
Event	Gold	Silver	Bronze
Men's individual	Tang Chih-chun; Chinese Taipei	Qin Wangyu; China	Berkim Tümer; Turkey
Men's team	Japan; Tetsuya Aoshima; Yuya Funahashi; Kosei Shirai	South Korea; Kim Seon-woo; Kim Ye-chan; Seo Min-gi	Turkey; Berkay Akkoyun; Berkim Tümer; Abdullah Yıldırmış
Women's individual	Nam Su-hyeon; South Korea	Liu Yianxu; China	Ruka Uehara; Japan
Women's team	Japan; Nanami Asakuno; Waka Sonoda; Ruka Uehara	Chinese Taipei; Fong You-jhu; Kuo Tzu-ying; Li Cai-xuan	China; Huang Yuwei; Liu Yanxiu; Wu Zihan
Mixed team	Liu Yanxiu; Wang Yan; China	Waka Sonoda; Yuya Funahashi; Japan	Nam Su-hyeon; Seo Min-gi; South Korea

=== Compound ===
Event	Gold	Silver	Bronze
Men's individual	Sahil Rajesh Jadhav; India	Ajay Scott; Great Britain	Przemysław Konecki; Poland
Men's team	Turkey; Batuhan Akçaoğlu; Yakup Yıldız; Yunus Emre Arslan	India; Kushal Dalal; Hritik Sharma; Sahil Rajesh Jadhav	South Korea; Kim Sung-chul; Lee Eun-ho; Park Seung-hyun
Women's individual	Moon Ye-eun; South Korea	Parneet Kaur; India	Park Ye-rin; South Korea
Women's team	South Korea; Kim Soo-yeon; Moon Ye-eun; Park Ye-rin	United States; Leann Drake; Sydney Sullenberger; Danielle Woodie	India; Parneet Kaur; Avneet Kaur; Madhura Dhamangaonkar
Mixed team	Parneet Kaur; Kushal Dalal; India	Park Ye-rin; Park Seung-hyun; South Korea	Hallie Boulton; Ajay Scott; Great Britain

== Participant NUSFs ==
51 National University Sporting Federations (NUSF)s participated at the 2025 Summer World University Games.

1. Argentina (1)
2. Australia (3)
3. Austria (1)
4. Azerbaijan (2)
5. Belgium (4)
6. Canada (7)
7. China (9)
8. Croatia (7)
9. Czech Republic (2)
10. Denmark (1)
11. Estonia (3)
12. Finland (2)
13. France (10)
14. Great Britain (8)
15. Germany (9)
16. Guatemala (1)
17. Hong Kong (4)
18. Hungary (1)
19. India (12)
20. Individual Neutral Athletes (2)
21. Ireland (4)
22. Israel (6)
23. Italy (12)
24. Japan (8)
25. Kazakhstan (7)
26. South Korea (12)
27. Latvia (2)
28. Malaysia (12)
29. Moldova (6)
30. Mexico (3)
31. Mongolia (3)
32. Netherlands (6)
33. Norway (2)
34. New Zealand (2)
35. Pakistan (2)
36. Philippines (2)
37. Poland (7)
38. Portugal (4)
39. Romania (9)
40. South Africa (5)
41. Singapore (9)
42. Slovenia (5)
43. San Marino (2)
44. Switzerland (6)
45. Slovakia (4)
46. Sweden (3)
47. Tajikistan (2)
48. Chinese Taipei (12)
49. Turkey (10)
50. Ukraine (11)
51. United States (12)
52. Uzbekistan (4)
