= Archery at the 2025 Summer World University Games – Women's team compound =

Women's team compound at the 2025 Summer World University Games
- Venue: Sportpark am Hallo (qualification); Zollverein Coal Mine Industrial Complex (finals)
- Location: Essen, Germany
- Dates: 22 – 25 July 2025
- Competitors: 12 from 36 nations

Medalists
gold medal	Kim Soo-yeon; Moon Ye-eun; Park Ye-rin	South Korea
silver medal	Leann Drake; Sydney Sullenberger; Danielle Woodie	United States
bronze medal	Parneet Kaur; Avneet Kaur; Madhura Dhamangaonkar	India

The women's team compound archery competition at the 2025 Summer World University Games was held at the Sportpark am Hallo and the Zollverein Coal Mine Industrial Complex in Essen, Germany from 22 to 25 July 2025.

== Records ==
Prior to the competition, the world and Universiade records were as follows.

- 216 arrows ranking round

Category	Team	Athlete	Record	Date	Place	Event
World record	South Korea	Han Seung-yeon	2126	21 May 2024	Yecheon, South Korea	World Cup
World record	South Korea	Oh Yoo-hyun	2126	21 May 2024	Yecheon, South Korea	World Cup
World record	South Korea	Song Yun-soo	2126	21 May 2024	Yecheon, South Korea	World Cup
Universiade record	South Korea (KOR)	Song Yun-soo	2060	4 July 2015	Gwangju, South Korea	2015 Summer Universiade
Universiade record	South Korea (KOR)	Seol Da-yeong	2060	4 July 2015	Gwangju, South Korea	2015 Summer Universiade
Universiade record	South Korea (KOR)	Kim Yun-hee	2060	4 July 2015	Gwangju, South Korea	2015 Summer Universiade

== Qualification round ==
The ranking round took place on 22 July 2025 to determine the seeding for the elimination rounds. It consisted of two rounds of 216 arrows, with a maximum score of 2160.

Qualified for 1/8 Round
Qualified for Quarterfinals

Rank	Team	Archers	Individual			Team		
Rank	Team	Archers	Total	10s	Xs	Total	10s	Xs
1	South Korea	Kim Soo-yeon	689	44	17	2084 FR	149	58
1	South Korea	Moon Yeeun	695	50	20	2084 FR	149	58
1	South Korea	Park Ye-rin	700	55	21	2084 FR	149	58
2	India	Madhura Dhamangaonkar	687	42	13	2061	133	43
2	India	Parneet Kaur	701	53	13	2061	133	43
2	India	Avneet Kaur	673	38	17	2061	133	43
3	United States	Leann Drake	679	39	13	2041	115	48
3	United States	Sydney Sullenberger	680	37	16	2041	115	48
3	United States	Danielle Woodie	682	39	19	2041	115	48
4	Great Britain	Chloe A'Bear	675	35	10	2025	111	37
4	Great Britain	Hallie Boulton	676	40	12	2025	111	37
4	Great Britain	Grace Chappell	674	36	15	2025	111	37
5	Chinese Taipei	Chen Si-yu	685	38	13	2023	102	43
5	Chinese Taipei	Chiu Yu-erh	668	33	12	2023	102	43
5	Chinese Taipei	Lin Yu-fan	670	31	18	2023	102	43
6	Kazakhstan	Elmira Raissova	674	35	15	1912	98	37
6	Kazakhstan	Aizhan Seidakhmetova	658	24	9	1912	98	37
6	Kazakhstan	Roxana Yunussova	680	39	13	1912	98	37
7	Italy	Francesca Aloisi	677	33	10	1997	94	37
7	Italy	Elisa Bazzichetto	651	34	15	1997	94	37
7	Italy	Andrea Moccia	669	27	12	1997	94	37
8	Croatia	Lara Drobnjak	640	17	6	1972	83	29
8	Croatia	Mia Međimurec	645	25	9	1972	83	29
8	Croatia	Amanda Mlinarić	687	41	14	1972	83	29
9	Malaysia	Syaza Mahari	653	27	9	1965	81	26
9	Malaysia	Natasha Shahruddin	668	30	10	1965	81	26
9	Malaysia	Nisa Radzif	644	24	7	1965	81	26
10	Ukraine	Viktoriia Kardash	658	30	14	1953	91	27
10	Ukraine	Olha Khomutovska	677	39	8	1953	91	27
10	Ukraine	Yelyzaveta Sushko	618	22	5	1953	91	27
11	Singapore	Carissa Goh	645	25	9	1945	77	31
11	Singapore	Shannon Lee	623	19	9	1945	77	31
11	Singapore	Ellie Low	677	33	13	1945	77	31
12	Romania	Alexandra Creangă	582	15	7	1854	49	21
12	Romania	Bernadett Haragoș	630	15	8	1854	49	21
12	Romania	Elena Topliceanu	642	19	9	1854	49	21

== Elimination round ==
The results are as below.

1/8 finals
9	Malaysia	204
8	Croatia	213
5	Chinese Taipei	229
12	Romania	217
11	Singapore	216
6	Kazakhstan	226
7	Italy	224
10	Ukraine	217

Quarterfinals
1	South Korea	236
8	Croatia	225
5	Chinese Taipei	229
4	Great Britain	230
3	United States	233
6	Kazakhstan	228
7	Italy	226
2	India	232

Semifinals
1	South Korea	238 UR
4	Great Britain	227
3	United States	233
2	India	230

Final
1	South Korea	233
3	United States	230
Bronze medal match
4	Great Britain	224
2	India	232
