= Athletics at the 2025 Summer World University Games – Men's 3000 metres steeplechase =

Men's 3000 metres steeplechase at the 2025 Summer World University Games
- Venue: Lohrheidestadion
- Location: Bochum, Germany
- Dates: 24 July (heats); 26 July (final)
- Competitors: 24 from 17 nations
- Winning time: 8:18.46 GR

Medalists
gold medal	Ruben Querinjean	Luxembourg
silver medal	Alejandro Quijada	Spain
bronze medal	István Palkovits	Hungary

The men's 3000 metres steeplechase event at the 2025 Summer World University Games was held in Bochum, Germany, at Lohrheidestadion on 24 and 26 July.

== Records ==
Prior to the competition, the records were as follows:

Record	Athlete (nation)	Time (s)	Location	Date
Games record	Halil Akkaş (TUR)	8:20.83	Bangkok, Thailand	13 August 2007

== Results ==
=== Heats ===
First 8 in each heat (Q) qualified for the final.

==== Heat 1 ====
Place	Athlete	Nation	Time	Notes
1	Rob McManus	United States	8:48.17	Q
2	Frank Geovani Duran	Colombia	8:49.10	Q, PB
3	Ármin Lesták	Hungary	8:50.39	Q
4	Tetsu Sasaki	Japan	8:51.38	Q
5	Wiktor Antosz	Poland	8:51.43	Q
6	Alejandro Quijada	Spain	8:51.62	Q
7	Gil Weicherding	Luxembourg	8:51.72	Q
8	Roberto Angel Marquez	Mexico	8:53.75	Q
9	Alexander Sproston	Great Britain	8:58.94	
10	Nils Bredin	Sweden	8:59.55	PB
11	Lovro Nedeljković	Croatia	9:04.07	
12	Sunil Jinabhai Joliya	India	9:08.37	

==== Heat 2 ====
Place	Athlete	Nation	Time	Notes
1	Owen Smith	United States	8:46.17	Q
2	Cuma Özcan	Turkey	8:46.56	Q
3	Ruben Querinjean	Luxembourg	8:46.68	Q
4	Tomáš Habarta	Czech Republic	8:46.77	Q
5	Marco Vanderpoorten	Belgium	8:47.31 [.302]	Q
6	István Palkovits	Hungary	8:47.31 [.303]	Q
7	Adam Bajorski	Poland	8:47.96	Q
8	Stephen Kerfoot	Great Britain	8:49.86	Q, PB
9	Bruno Belčić	Croatia	8:54.75	
10	Ofentse Bokaba	South Africa	9:01.12	
11	José Lino Fajardo Loja	Ecuador	10:40.53	
—	Ranvir Ajay Singh	India	DQ	

=== Final ===
Place	Athlete	Nation	Time	Notes
1st place, gold medalist(s)	Ruben Querinjean	Luxembourg	8:18.46	GR
2nd place, silver medalist(s)	Alejandro Quijada	Spain	8:20.70	PB
3rd place, bronze medalist(s)	István Palkovits	Hungary	8:35.05	
4	Cuma Özcan	Turkey	8:38.70	PB
5	Adam Bajorski	Poland	8:38.91	
6	Rob McManus	United States	8:41.52	
7	Tetsu Sasaki	Japan	8:41.53	
8	Wiktor Antosz	Poland	8:45.29	
9	Owen Smith	United States	8:48.86	
10	Gil Weicherding	Luxembourg	8:49.67	
11	Tomáš Habarta	Czech Republic	8:55.40	
12	Frank Geovani Duran	Colombia	8:56.52	
13	Roberto Angel Marquez	Mexico	8:58.11	
14	Stephen Kerfoot	Great Britain	8:59.10	
15	Ármin Lesták	Hungary	9:03.80	
16	Marco Vanderpoorten	Belgium	9:11.53	
