= India at the 2025 Summer World University Games =

India at the 2025 World University Games
- IOC code: IND
- NOC: Association of Indian Universities (AIU)
- Website: www.aiu.ac.in

in Rhine-Ruhr region, Germany 16 July 2025 – 27 July 2025
- Competitors: 300+ in TBD sports
- Flag bearer: Abhay Shinde
- Medals Ranked 20th: Gold 2 Silver 5 Bronze 5 Total 12

Summer appearances
- 2013; 2019; 2021; 2025; 2027

India competed at the 2025 Summer World University Games, held from 16 July to 27 July 2025 in Rhine-Ruhr region, Germany. The nation sent its largest-ever delegation, comprising over 300 athletes from various colleges nationwide. India finished in 20th position after winning 12 medals, two gold, five silver and five bronze.

During the event, the Indian badminton players raised concerns about mismanagement by the Officials, who allegedly threatened the players when they raised the issue. The Association of Indian Universities took action against the erring officials after returning to India by constituting an inquiry committee. Baljit Singh Sekhon, Joint Secretary, was placed under suspension.

In swimming, Srihari Nataraj, broke the Indian record in the men's 100m freestyle, clocking 49.46 seconds on way to the semifinals.

== Medalists ==
Medal	Name	Sport	Event	Date
Gold	Kushal Dalal; Parneet Kaur	Archery	Mixed Compound Team	25 July
Gold	Sahil Rajesh Jadhav	Archery	Men's Compound Individual	26 July
Silver	Hritik Sharma; Kushal Dalal; Sahil Rajesh Jadhav	Archery	Men's Compound Team	25 July
Silver	Parneet Kaur	Archery	Women's Individual	26 July
Silver	Praveen Chithravel	Athletics	Men's Triple Jump	26 July
Silver	Seema Kumari	Athletics	Women's 5000 metres	26 July
Silver	Ankita Dhyani	Athletics	Women's 3000 metres steeplechase	27 July
Bronze	India national badminton team: Sathish Karunakaran; Saneeth Dayanand; Vaishnavi Khadkekar; Tasnim Mir; Devika Sihag; Varshini Viswanath Sri	Badminton	Mixed Team	20 July
Bronze	Vaishnavi Adkar	Tennis	Women's Individual	24 July
Bronze	Avneet Kaur; Madhura Dhamangaokar; Parneet Kaur	Archery	Women's Compound Team	25 July
Bronze	Sejal Anil Singh; Munita Prajapati; Mansi Negi; Shailini Choudhary; Mahima Choudhary	Athletics	Women's 20km Walk Team	27 July
Bronze	Mrutyam Dondapati; Gurindervir Singh; Lalu Prasad Bhoi; Animesh Kujur; Manikanta Hoblidhar	Athletics	Men's 4 x 100m relay	27 July

Medals by sport
Sport	Gold	Silver	Bronze	Total
Archery	2	2	1	5
Athletics	0	3	2	5
Badminton	0	0	1	1
Tennis	0	0	1	1
Total	2	5	5	12

Medals by day
Day	Date	Gold	Silver	Bronze	Total
4	20 July	0	0	1	1
8	24 July	0	0	1	1
9	25 July	1	1	1	3
10	26 July	1	3	0	4
11	27 July	0	1	2	3
	Total	2	5	5	12

Medals by gender
Gender	Gold	Silver	Bronze	Total
Male	1	2	1	4
Mixed	1	0	1	2
Female	0	3	3	6
Total	2	5	5	12

Multiple medalists
Name	Event	1st place, gold medalist(s)	2nd place, silver medalist(s)	3rd place, bronze medalist(s)	Total
Parneet Kaur	Archery	1	1	1	3
Kushal Dalal	Archery	1	1	0	2
Sahil Jadhav	Archery	1	1	0	2

== 3x3 Basketball ==
Event	Group stage			Play-in	Quarterfinal	Semifinal	Final / BM	
Event	Opposition Score	Opposition Score	Rank	Opposition Score	Opposition Score	Opposition Score	Opposition Score	Rank
Men's Team	Germany; L 6-21	Mongolia; L 19-21	3	Italy; L 7-21	Did not advance to next round			

== Archery ==
=== Recurve ===
Athlete	Event	Ranking Round		Round of 96	Round of 48	1/16 / 1/12	Round of 16	Quarterfinals	Semifinals	Final / BM	
Athlete	Event	Score	Seed	Opposition Score	Opposition Score	Opposition Score	Opposition Score	Opposition Score	Opposition Score	Opposition Score	Rank
Aryan Rana	Men's; Individual	640	29	(Romania) Vlase; W 6-4	(Azerbaijan) Aliyev; W 6-4	(Japan) Funahashi; L 2-6	Did not advance to next round				
Mrinal Chauhan	Men's; Individual	622	47	(Guatemala) Allen; W 7-1	(Turkey) Tumer; L 4-6	Did not advance to next round					
Vishnu Choudhary	Men's; Individual	627	42	(South Africa) Young; W 7-1	(Turkey) Yıldırmış; L 2-6	Did not advance to next round					
Aditi Jaiswal	Women's; Individual	637	24	—N/a	(Germany) Kellerer; L 4-6	Did not advance to next round					
Basanti Mahato	Women's; Individual	647	13	—N/a	(Argentina) Zapata; W 6-0	(Malaysia) Mashayikh; W 6-4	(United States) Gnoriega; W 6-2	(Japan) Uehara; L 1-7	Did not advance to next round		
Bhajan Kaur	Women's; Individual	642	21	—N/a	(Australia) Denier; L 3-7	Did not advance to next round					
Aryan Rana; Mrinal Chauhan; Vishnu Choudhary	Men's; Team	1889	12	—N/a			United States; W 5-3	Chinese Taipei; L 3-5	Did not advance to next round		
Aditi Jaiswal; Basanti Mahato; Bhajan Kaur	Women's; Team	1926	5	—N/a			Turkey; W 6-0	Chinese Taipei; L 1-5	Did not advance to next round		
Aryan Rana; Basanti Mahato	Mixed; Team	1287	9	—N/a		San Marino; W 6-0	Italy; L 0-6	Did not advance to next round			

=== Compound ===
Athlete	Event	Ranking Round		Round of 96	Round of 48	1/16 / 1/12	Round of 16	Quarterfinals	Semifinals	Final / BM	
Athlete	Event	Score	Seed	Opposition Score	Opposition Score	Opposition Score	Opposition Score	Opposition Score	Opposition Score	Opposition Score	Rank
Hritik Sharma	Men's; Individual	694	13	—N/a	(United States) Nevitt; W 146-140	(France) Dubois; L 143-146	Did not advance to next round				
Kushal Dalal	Men's; Individual	706	2	—N/a		(France) Bouleau; W 148-147	(Turkey) Arslan; W 148^{10}-148^{9}	(Germany) Flüss; W 148-146	(India) Jadhav; L 148^{10}-148^{10+}	(Poland) Konecki; L 148-150	4
Sahil Rajesh Jadhav	Men's; Individual	699	6	—N/a		(Chinese Taipei) Huang; W 145-143	(Slovenia) Brenk; W 148-147	(United Kingdom) Clark; W 146-142	(India) Dalal; W 148^{10+}-148^{10}	(United Kingdom) Scott; W 149-148	1st place, gold medalist(s)
Avneet Kaur	Women's; Individual	673	22	—N/a	(Croatia) Drobnjak; W 144-139	(Turkey) Burun; W 145-144	(India) Dhamangaokar; W 145-142	(South Korea) Moon; L 140-146	Did not advance to next round		
Madhura Dhamangaokar	Women's; Individual	687	6	—N/a		(Italy) Bazzichetto; W 143-142	(India) A. Kaur; L 142-145	Did not advance to next round			
Parneet Kaur	Women's; Individual	701	1	—N/a		(Kazakhstan) Seidakhmetova; W 146-145	(Singapore) Low; W 148-144	(France) Chambraud; W 144-141	(South Korea) Kim; W 145-144	(South Korea) Moon; L 146-147	2nd place, silver medalist(s)
Hritik Sharma; Kushal Dalal; Sahil Jadhav	Men's; Team	2099	1	—N/a				United States; W 236-229	Chinese Taipei; W 235-233	Turkey; L 231-232	2nd place, silver medalist(s)
Avneet Kaur; Madhura Dhamangaokar; Parneet Kaur	Women's; Team	2061	2	—N/a				Italy; W 232-226	United States; L 230-233	United Kingdom; W 232-224	3rd place, bronze medalist(s)
Kushal Dalal; Parneet Kaur	Mixed; Team	1407	2	—N/a			Singapore; W 158-153	United States; W 158-157	Chinese Taipei; W 158-151	South Korea; W 157-154	1st place, gold medalist(s)

== Athletics ==
=== Road and Track events ===
Men

Athlete	Event	Heat		Semifinal		Final	
Athlete	Event	Result	Rank	Result	Rank	Result	Rank
Gurindervir Singh	100m	11.00	4	Did not advance			
Manikanta Hoblidhar	100m	10.74	3	Did not advance			
Animesh Kujur	200m	21.16	1Q	20.94	3q	20.85	4
Manikanta Hoblidhar	200m	21.42	4	Did not advance			
Abhishek	400m	48.58	33	Did not advance			
Anu Kumar	800m	1:56.33	8	Did not advance			
Rijoy Jayasankar	800m	1:51.73	6	Did not advance			
Arjun Waskale	1500m	3:47.36	23	Did not advance			
Gagan Singh	5000m	14:22.20	11	Did not advance			
Kiran Matre	5000m	14:41.49	2Q	—N/a		15:16.57	16
Abhishek Devkate	10000m	—N/a				33:46.77	26
Kiran Matre	10000m	—N/a				29:49.90	17
Trilok Kumar	10000m	—N/a				36:00.27	27
Rahil Vadkkepurath	110m hurdles	DSQ		Did not advance			
Tejas Ashok Shirse	110m hurdles	DNS		Did not advance			
Ruchit Mori	400m hurdles	50.58 PB	3Q	51.04	7	Did not advance	
Sunil Joliya	3000m steeplechase	9:08.37	12	Did not advance			
Ranvir Singh	3000m steeplechase	DNF	11	Did not advance			
Mohit Kumar	Half; Marathon	—N/a				1:04:08 PB	6
Mohit Choudhary	Half; Marathon	—N/a				1:06:51 PB	22
Arun Rathod	Half; Marathon	—N/a				1:07:19	26
Shubham Baliyan	Half; Marathon	—N/a				1:08:32 PB	34
Ankit Deshwal	Half; Marathon	—N/a				1:09:07	36
Mohit; Mohit Choudhary; Arun Rathod; Shubham Baliyan; Ankit Deshwal	Half; Marathon; Team	—N/a				3:18:18	5
Rahul	20km Walk	—N/a				1:26:34 SB	20
Gaurav Kumar	20km Walk	—N/a				1:28:44	25
Sachin Bohra	20km Walk	—N/a				1:32:03	28
Sanjay Kumar	20km Walk	—N/a				1:46:21	31
Rahul; Gaurav Kumar; Sachin Bohra; Sanjay Kumar	20km Walk Team	—N/a				4:27:21	6

Women

Athlete	Event	Heat		Semifinal		Final	
Athlete	Event	Result	Rank	Result	Rank	Result	Rank
Abinaya Rajarajan	100m	11.88	2Q	11.73	4	Did not advance	
Mariya Angelsilvia	100m	12.03	5	Did not advance			
Mariya Angelsilvia	200m	24.01	4q	24.56	6	Did not advance	
Sonia	200m	24.84	6	Did not advance			
Amandeep Kaur	800m	2:03.89	4Q	2:04.84	7	Did not advance	
Chanda	800m	2:05.95	2Q	2:02.05	2Q	2:02.00	8
Chanda	1500m	4:20.84	9	Did not advance			
Kajal Kanawade	1500m	4:50.06	13	Did not advance			
Sanjana Singh	5000m	17:04.21	11	Did not advance			
Seema Kumari	5000m	15:55.33	3Q	—N/a		15.35.86 SB	2nd place, silver medalist(s)
Moumita Mondal	100m hurdles	13.37	6q	13:42	7	Did not advance	
Deekshita Gowda	400m hurdles	59.76 PB	6	Did not advance			
Shreevarthani Kavitha	400m hurdles	DNF		Did not advance			
Ankita Dhyani	3000m steeplechase	9:54.79	1Q	—N/a		9:31.99 PB	2nd place, silver medalist(s)
Manju Yadav	3000m steeplechase	11:24.71	10	Did not advance			
Jyoti	Half; Marathon	—N/a				1:21:22	21
Aarti Pawara	Half; Marathon	—N/a				1:22:50	22
Rinkee Pawara	Half; Marathon	—N/a				1:25:33	24
Basanti Kumari	Half; Marathon	—N/a				1:26:16	25
Svati Pal	Half; Marathon	—N/a				1:37:13	26
Jyoti; Aarti Pawara; Rinkee Pawara; Basanti Kumari; Svati Pal	Half; Marathon; Team	—N/a				4:09:45	4
Sejal Singh	20km Walk	—N/a				1:35:21 PB	15
Munita Prajapati	20km Walk	—N/a				1:39:33	18
Mansi Negi	20km Walk	—N/a				1:41:12	20
Shalini Choudhary	20km Walk	—N/a				1:48:07	23
Mahima Choudhary	20km Walk	—N/a				1:55:49	25
Sejal Singh; Munita Prajapati; Mansi Negi; Shalini; Mahima Choudhary	20km Walk Team	—N/a				4:56:06	3rd place, bronze medalist(s)

Relay

Athlete	Event	Heat		Final	
Athlete	Event	Result	Rank	Result	Rank
Mrutyam Dondapati; Gurindervir Singh; Lalu Prasad Bhoi; Animesh Kujur; Manikanta Hoblidhar	Men's; 4 x 100m	39.21 SB	2Q	38.89 SB	3rd place, bronze medalist(s)
Sonia; Mariya Angelsilvia; Sudheeksha Vadluri; Abinaya Rajarajan; Moumita Mondal; Ancy Edappilly	Women's; 4 x 100m	44.44 SB	4q	45.06	7
Abhishek; Vishal Kayalvizhi; Jerome Panimaya; Balakrishna; Aswin Lakshmanan	Men's; 4 x 400m	3:06.56 SB	2Q	3:06.56	5
Anakha Anila; Devyaniba Zala; Rashdeep Kaur; Rupal	Women's; 4 x 400m	3:35.12 SB	2Q	3:35.08 SB	5
Jerome Panimaya; Rupal; Vishal Kayalvizhi; Devyaniba Zala	Mixed; 4 x 400m	3:19.21 SB	2Q	3:18.40 SB	4

=== Field events ===
Men

Athlete	Event	Qualification		Final	
Athlete	Event	Result	Rank	Result	Rank
Abhimanyu	Discus Throw	52.85	12q	NM	
Alex Thankachan	Discus Throw	47.14	18	Did not advance	
Gurdev Singh	Hammer Throw	NM		Did not advance	
Bharathraj Bijuraj	High Jump	2.03	10	Did not advance	
Sagar	Javelin Throw	69.63	16	Did not advance	
Sahil Silwal	Javelin Throw	71.60	10q	73.76	7
David Solomon	Long Jump	7.63	11q	DNS	
Jeswin Aldrin	Long Jump	7.43	18	Did not advance	
Dev Kumar Meena	Pole Vault	5.40 PB	6q	5.35	5
Reegan Ganesan	Pole Vault	4.85	29	Did not advance	
Samardeep Gill	Shot Put	19.10	4q	19.16	6
Sawan	Shot Put	17.03	21	Did not advance	
Praveen Chithravel	Triple Jump	16.25	4q	16.66	2nd place, silver medalist(s)
M.M. Muhassin	Triple Jump	NM		Did not advance	

Women

Athlete	Event	Qualification		Final	
Athlete	Event	Result	Rank	Result	Rank
Sanya Yadav	Discus Throw	51.21 PB	9q	49.88	10
Priya	Discus Throw	48.25	14	Did not advance	
Pallavi Patil	High Jump	1.71	20	Did not advance	
Pooja Pooja	High Jump	DNS		Did not advance	
Karishma Sanil	Javelin Throw	53.12	9q	52.93	10
Shakshi Sharma	Javelin Throw	39.84	21	Did not advance	
Ancy Edappilly	Long Jump	6.20	11q	6.29	8
Moumita Mondal	Long Jump	6.00	21	Did not advance	
Sindhushree Ganesha	Pole Vault	NM		Did not advance	
Vanshika Ghanghas	Pole Vault	3.50	24	Did not advance	
Poorna Raorane	Shot Put	14.54	21	Did not advance	
Shiksha	Shot Put	15.27	15	Did not advance	
Poorva Sawant	Triple Jump	12.82	16	Did not advance	
Sandra Babu	Triple Jump	11.98	22	Did not advance	

=== Combined events ===
Men's decathlon

Athlete	Event	100 m	LJ	SP	HJ	400 m	110H	DT	PV	JT	1500 m	Final	Rank
Jashbir Nayak	Result	11.30 (14)	6.71 PB (13)	12.49 PB (12)	1.88 (6)	51.16 PB (13)	15.30 PB (11)	35.64 (14)				5026	12
Jashbir Nayak	Points	795	746	636	696	762	614	577				5026	12
Thowfeeq Rasheed	Result	11.10 PB (8)	6.84 (9)	9.97 (21)	1.91 PB (4)	49.29 (4)	15.55 (14)	35.49 (16)				5027	11
Thowfeeq Rasheed	Points	838	776	484	723	848	784	574				5027	11

Women's heptathlon

Athlete	Event	100H	HJ	SP	200 m	LJ	JT	800 m	Final	Rank
Pooja	Result	14.97 PB	1.71 SB	11.15	26.09 PB	5.33	41.17	2:19.67 PB	5276 SB	17
Pooja	Points	846	867	605	789	651	690	828	5276 SB	17
Tanushree	Result	15.53 PB	1.62	8.69	27.15 SB	NM	39.47 SB	2:26.02 SB	4076	25
Tanushree	Points	773	759	444	699	NM	657	744	4076	25

== Badminton ==
=== Singles ===
Player	Event	Round of 128	Round of 64	Round of 32	Round of 16	Quarter-finals	Semi-finals	Final / BM	
Player	Event	Opponent score	Opponent score	Opponent score	Opponent score	Opponent score	Opponent score	Opponent score	Rank
Rohan Anandas	Men's	(Australia) Ooi; W 2-1	(Chinese Taipei) Pui; W 2-0	(Germany) Oei; W 2-0	(Germany) Kicklitz; L 1-2	Did not advance to next round			
Saneeth Dayanand	Men's	—N/a	(Poland) Cimosz; W 2-0	(Poland) Wilczak; W 2-0	(France) Roy; L 0-2	Did not advance to next round			
Darshan Pujari	Men's	—N/a	(Saudi Arabia) Shaikh; W 2-1	(Finland) Melleri; W 2-0	(Japan) Miyashita; L 0-2	Did not advance to next round			
Devika Sihag	Women's	—N/a	(Nigeria) Obasanmi; W 2-0	(Slovakia) Kadlecova; W 2-0	(South Korea) Soyul; W 2-0	(Malaysia) Wong; L 0-2	Did not advance to next round		
Aditi Bhatt	Women's	—N/a	(Netherlands) Odijk; W 2-0	(Singapore) Danial; W 2-0	(Thailand) Kleebyeesun; L 0-2	Did not advance to next round			

=== Doubles ===
Player	Event	Round of 64	Round of 32	Round of 16	Quarter-finals	Semi-finals	Final / BM	
Player	Event	Opponent score	Opponent score	Opponent score	Opponent score	Opponent score	Opponent score	Rank
Abinash Mohanty; Viraj Kuvale	Men's	(Japan) Masumoto / Miyashita; L 1-2	Did not advance to next round					
Saneeth Dayanand; Darshan Pujari	Men's	—N/a	(France) Begga / Labarthe; L 0-2	Did not advance to next round				
Aditi Bhatt; Devika Sihag	Women's	Nepal / Subba; W 2-0	(Singapore) Chan / Choo; W 2-0	(Netherlands) Odijk / Van Leijsen; W 2-0	(China) Liu / Tang; L 0-2	Did not advance to next round		
Alisha Khan; Vaishnavi Khadkekar	Women's	—N/a	(Turkey) Bektas / Korkmaz; L 0-2	Did not advance to next round				
Abinash Mohanty; Varshini Viswanath	Mixed	(Australia) Wang / Ea; L 1-2	Did not advance to next round					
Viraj Kuvale; Alisha Khan	Mixed	(Sri Lanka) De Silva / Amanda; W 2-0	(Germany) Dresp / Nguyen; L 1-2	Did not advance to next round				
Sathish Karunakaran; Vaishnavi Khadkekar	Mixed	(Poland) Butkus / Zimnol; W 2-0	(Malaysia) Liew / Gobi; L 0-2; RET	Did not advance to next round				

=== Mixed Team ===
Players	Group stage			Round of 16	Quarterfinal	Semifinal	Final / BM	
Players	Opposition Score	Opposition Score	Rank	Opposition Score	Opposition Score	Opposition Score	Opposition Score	Rank
Sathish Karunakaran; Saneeth Dayanand; Vaishnavi Khadkekar; Tasnim Mir; Devika Sihag; Varshini Viswanath Sri	Macau; W 5-0	Hong Kong; L 2-3	2Q	United States; W 3-1	Malaysia; W 3-2	Chinese Taipei; L 1-3	Did not advance	3rd place, bronze medalist(s)

== Basketball ==
Event	Group stage				9-16 placing	13-16 placing	15-16 placing	
Event	Opposition Score	Opposition Score	Opposition Score	Rank	Opposition Score	Opposition Score	Opposition Score	Rank
Men's Team	United States; L 52-111	Romania; L 73-108	Latvia; L 55-114	4	Chinese Taipei; L 77-102	Argentina; L 52-79		
Women's Team	Czech Republic; L 33-137	Argentina; L 57-86	Finland; L 35-117	4	Germany; L 45-116	Romania; L 58-109	Argentina; L 65-81	16

== Fencing ==
=== Men ===
Group Stage

Athlete	Event	Group stage						
Athlete	Event	Opposition Score	Opposition Score	Opposition Score	Opposition Score	Opposition Score	Opposition Score	Rank
Dhruv Walia	Sabre; Individual	(Poland) Kutek; L 3-5	(Spain) Gonzalez; L 3-5	(Turkey) Altincekic; L 2-5	(Sweden) Penker; W 5-1	(Germany) Müller; L 1-5	(South Korea) Lim; L 1-5	6
Abhay Krishna Shinde	Sabre; Individual	(Sweden) Heubi; W 5-0	(France) Baylac; W 5-4	(Mexico) Rodriguez Hernandez; L 3-5	(Turkey) Kalender; W 5-3	(Hong Kong) Ho; L 0-5	(Germany) Seefeld; W 5-4	3Q
Chirag Nain	Sabre; Individual	(Saudi Arabia) Alhashem; L 1-5	(Kazakhstan) Ergashbay; L 2-5	(Azerbaijan) Mammadov; L 2-5	(Hungary) Vigh; L 0-5	(Italy) Rea; L 0-5	(Japan) Kato; L 2-5	7
Aditya Atul Angal	Sabre; Individual	(Germany) Schenkel; L 3-5	(Japan) Hiwatashi; L 0-5	(Poland) Szczepanik; L 2-5	(Australia) Raja; L 0-5	(Saudi Arabia) Albahrani; L 1-5	(United States) Huang; L 0-5	7
Vemani Lokesh	Epee; Individual	(Latvia) Kaicovskis; L 4-5	(New Zealand) Peterson; W 5-2	(Italy) Mencarelli; L 1-5	(South Korea) Nam; L 1-5	(Saudi Arabia) Alfihani; W 5-4	(Individual Neutral Athletes) Shvelidze; L 2-5	6
Sufyan Waheed Sohil	Epee; Individual	(Switzerland) Brochard; L 2-5	(Israel) Baylac; L 2-5	(United Kingdom) Jeal; L 0-5	(South Korea) Heo; L 2-3	(Sweden) Bäckström; L 3-5	(Chinese Taipei) Hsu; L 4-5	7
Shankar Pandey	Epee; Individual	(Hungary) Kovács; L 1-5	(United States) Dieck; L 1-5	(Israel) Khaperskiy; L 3-5	(Sweden) Fagerstedt; L 2-5	(Netherlands) Stroop; L 1-4	(Saudi Arabia) Hazazi; L 4-5	7
Balram Joshi	Epee; Individual	(Hong Kong) Ng; W 5-3	(Poland) Socha; L 2-5	(Spain) Fernández Calleja; W 5-4	(Australia) Pratley; W 5-3	(Saudi Arabia) Albahrani; L 1-5	(Norway) Geitung; L 4-5	4Q
Harshil Sharma	Foil; Individual	(Poland) Nowak; L 2-5	(Australia) Mautner; L 1-5	(Qatar) Hussein; L 3-5	(Germany) Fabinger; L 0-5	(Italy) Lombardi; L 0-5	(Chinese Taipei) Hsu; L 2-5	7
Ajaysinh Chudasama	Foil; Individual	(Poland) Bem; L 0-5	(Japan) Fukuda; L 2-5	(Slovakia) Kuchta; L 1-5	(France) Spichiger; L 2-5	(Ukraine) Muruhin; L 3-5	(Hungary) Seefeld; W 5-2	6
Sathvik Shoba Manjunatha	Foil; Individual	(Australia) Schulz; L 4-5	(United States) Burke; L 1-5	(France) Helmy Cocoynacq; L 1-5	(Ukraine) Lazarenko; L 2-5	(Hungary) Bagdány; L 2-5	(Japan) Nishiguchi; L 0-5	7
Abhinash Meitei Kangabam	Foil; Individual	(Italy) Pistorio; L 0-5	(United States Virgin Islands) Schembri; W 5-3	(Germany) Diestelkamp; L 0-5	(Netherlands) Jans; W 5-4	(Spain) Ferreiro Rodriguez; W 5-4	(Lebanon) Wakim; L 1-5	5Q

Elimination stage

Athlete	Event	Round of 128	Round of 64	Round of 32	Round of 16	Quarter-final	Semi-final	Final	Rank
Athlete	Event	Opposition Score	Opposition Score	Opposition Score	Opposition Score	Opposition Score	Opposition Score	Opposition Score	Rank
Abhay Shinde	Sabre individual	—N/a	(Spain) Fernández; L 13-15	Did not advance to next round					
Balram Joshi	Epee individual	(Chinese Taipei) Wu; W 15-12	(United States) Calderon Bartolome; L 5--15	Did not advance to next round					
Abhinash Kangabam	Foil individual	—N/a	(Qatar) Khalifa; W 15-5	(Israel) Eliaz; W 15-9	(Poland) Nowak; L 8-15	Did not advance to next round			
Dhruv Walia; Abhay Shinde; Chirag Nain; Aditya Angal	Sabre; Team	—N/a		Sweden; W 45-28	South Korea; L 11-45	Did not advance to next round			
Vemani Lokesh; Sufyan Sohil; Shankar Pandey; Balram Joshi	Epee; Team	—N/a		Poland; L 33-45	Did not advance to next round				
Harshil Sharma; Ajaysinh Chudasama; Sathvik Manjunatha; Abhinash Kangabam	Foil; Team	—N/a			France; L 20-45	Did not advance to next round			

=== Women ===
Group Stage

Athlete	Event	Group stage						
Athlete	Event	Opposition Score	Opposition Score	Opposition Score	Opposition Score	Opposition Score	Opposition Score	Rank
Jagmeet Kaur	Sabre individual	(Poland) Lai; L 2-5	(Hong Kong) Leung; L 4-5	(Turkey) Erbil; L 2-5	(Australia) Tang; W 5-1	(Japan) Takahashi; L 2-5	(Kazakhstan) Ko; W 5-3	4Q
Shreya Gupta	Sabre individual	(Germany) Kurzawa; W 5-2	(Japan) Suto; L 4-5	(South Korea) Seon; W 5-3	(Hong Kong) Sit; W 5-1	(France) Lusinier; L 3-5	(United Kingdom) Brierly; W 5-1	1Q
Rishika Khajuria	Sabre individual	(Germany) Weber; W 5-4	(Spain) Gallardo Gómez; W 5-2	(France) Tranquille; L 4-5	(Italy) Landi; L 1-5	(Austria) Tanzmeister; L 4-5	(Kazakhstan) Zhanybek; L 3-5	5Q
Aakhri Sharma	Sabre individual	(Turkey) Alkaya; W 5-2	(Germany) Graudins; W 5-3	(France) Mouroux; L 1-5	(Netherlands) Buitenhuis; L 0-5	(Italy) Di Carlo; L 1-5	—N/a	5Q
Mitva Jesangbhai Chaudhari	Epee individual	(Hong Kong) Lai; W 5-4	(France) Conrad; L 2-5	(Australia) Rice; W 5-2	(Italy) Siletti; W 5-4	(New Zealand) Tweddle; W 5-3	(Japan) Kishimoto; L 3-5	3Q
Yashkeerat Kaur Hayer	Epee individual	(Hong Kong) Heubi; L 2-5	(Lithuania) Vergnes; W 5-3	(Chinese Taipei) Wu; L 1-5	(United States) Hafeez; L 1-5	(South Korea) Kim; L 4-5	(Sweden) Engdahl; L 4-5	7
Tanuja Khatri	Epee individual	(Germany) Vandingenen; W 5-4	(Japan) Inayama; W 5-2	(Hungary) Salamon; L 2-5	(Saudi Arabia) Abed; L 4-5	(Slovenia) Parmesani; L 3-5	—N/a	5Q
Mumtaj Mumtaj	Epee individual	(Poland) Janelli; L 0-5	(Slovenia) Mlekuz; W 5-4	(Switzerland) Romeo; L 3-5	(Germany) Ziegler; L 3-5	(Sweden) Jawaid; L 2-5	—N/a	5
Kanagalakshmi Paranjothi	Foil individual	(United States) Kim; L 1-5	(Poland) Olszewska; L 4-5	(Italy) Grandis; L 1-5	(Japan) Nagase; L 3-5	(Latvia) Junele; W 5-4	(Slovakia) Cantucci; L 3-5	6
Somirin Alice Rungsung	Foil individual	(Australia) Tang; L 2-5	(New Zealand) Chan; L 2-5	(France) Bonny; L 0-5	(Ukraine) Horpenchenko; L 1-5	(Japan) Takeyama; L 0-5	(Germany) Witt; L 2-5	7
Khushi Ishwarbhai Sameja	Foil individual	(New Zealand) May; W 5-3	(Japan) Iwamoto; L 3-5	(United States) Wu; L 0-2	(Hungary) Marosi; L 1-5	(Germany) Kothieringer; L 1-5	(South Korea) Sim; L 0-5	7
Joys Ashitha Stalinraj	Foil individual	(Austria) Brugger-Brandauer; L 0-5	(New Zealand) H Wang; W 5-2	(Italy) Amore; L 2-5	(Hungary) Nekifor; L 2-5	(Cambodia) Jawaid; W 5-2	(South Korea) Park; L 2-5	5

Elimination stage

Athlete	Event	Round of 128	Round of 64	Round of 32	Round of 16	Quarter-final	Semi-final	Final	Rank
Athlete	Event	Opposition Score	Opposition Score	Opposition Score	Opposition Score	Opposition Score	Opposition Score	Opposition Score	Rank
Jagmeet Kaur	Sabre individual	—N/a	(Hong Kong) Sit; W 5-15	Did not advance to next round					
Shreya Gupta	Sabre individual	—N/a		(Spain) Gallardo Gómez; L 8-15	Did not advance to next round				
Rishika Khajuria	Sabre individual	—N/a	(Germany) Stemper; L 5-15	Did not advance to next round					
Aakhri Sharma	Sabre individual	—N/a	(Germany) Kurzawa; W 15-14	(France) Tranquille; L 10-15	Did not advance to next round				
Mitva Chaudhari	Epee individual	—N/a	(United Kingdom) Hillier; W 15-6	(Germany) Zittel; L 11-15	Did not advance to next round				
Tanuja Khatri	Epee individual	(Switzerland) Izzo; L 10-15	Did not advance to next round						
Jagmeet Kaur; Shreya Gupta; Rishika Khajuria; Aakhri Sharma	Sabre; Team	—N/a			Spain; L 31-45	Did not advance to next round			
Mitva Chaudhari; Yashkeerat Hayer; Tanuja Khatri; Mumtaj Mumtaj	Epee; Team	—N/a		Cambodia; W 45-19	Germany; L 21-45	Did not advance to next round			
Kanagalakshmi Paranjothi; Somirin Rungsung; Khushi Sameja; Ashitha Stalinraj	Foil; Team	—N/a			Poland; L 18-45	Did not advance to next round			

== Judo ==
Men

Athlete	Event	Round of 32	Round of 16	Quarter-final	Semi-final	Final	Rank
Athlete	Event	Opposition Score	Opposition Score	Opposition Score	Opposition Score	Opposition Score	Rank
Lucky Laishram	-60kg	(Brazil) Santos Rios; W 010-000; WAZ	(Mongolia) Tuvshintur; L 000-100; IPP	Did not advance to next round			
Mayank Kadian	-66kg	(Turkey) Kocabey; W 100-000; IPP	(Cyprus) Christodoulides; L 000-100; IPP	Did not advance to next round			
Tushar Kumar	-73kg	(Chile) Pérez; L 000-020; WAZ	Did not advance to next round				
Varun Sharma	-81kg	(Macau) Mao; L 000-100; IPP	Did not advance to next round				
Sheetal Ningthoujam	-90kg	(Slovenia) Pecnik; 25 July					
Harsh Sharma	-100kg	(Romania) Sibisan; 25 July					
Yash Ghanghas	+100kg	(Chinese Taipei) Dai; 25 July					

Women

Athlete	Event	Round of 32	Round of 16	Quarter-final	Semi-final	Final	Rank
Athlete	Event	Opposition Score	Opposition Score	Opposition Score	Opposition Score	Opposition Score	Rank
Rishita Kareliya	-48kg	(Ecuador) Ortega Tenecora; W 100-000; IPP	(Uzbekistan) Haydarova; L 000-100; IPP	Did not advance to next round			
Shraddha Chopade	-52kg	(Netherlands) Van der Salm; L 010-100; IPP	Did not advance to next round				
Rupanshi Sharma	-57kg	(Italy) Carnà; L 000-100; IPP	Did not advance to next round				
Himanshi Tokas	-63kg	—N/a	(Moldova) Tcaci; L 000-100; IPP	Did not advance to next round			
Taibanganbi Khaidem	-70kg	(Ukraine) Tsimko; L 000-100; IPP	Did not advance to next round				
Ishroop Narang	-78kg	—N/a	(Belgium) Verschaere; 25 July				
Muskan Rathi	+78kg	(Turkey) Coskun; 25 July					

== Swimming ==
Men

Athlete	Event	Heat		Semifinal		Final	
Athlete	Event	Time	Rank	Time	Rank	Time	Rank
Dhyaan Mahesh Kumar	50m backstroke	26.94	35	Did not advance			
Srihari Nataraj	50m backstroke	25.59	10Q	25.39	11	Did not advance	
Vidith Shiva Shankar	400m freestyle	28.36	23	Did not advance			
Yadesh Babu Mandey Suresh	400m freestyle	28.75	28	Did not advance			
Harsh Saroha	50m butterfly	25.41	52	Did not advance			
Rohit Beniston Manickaraj	50m butterfly	24.00	12Q	23.96	13	Did not advance	
Nithik Nathella	100m backstroke	57.43	29	Did not advance			
Vidith Shiva Shankar	100m breaststroke	1:02.02	21	Did not advance			
Yadesh Babu Mandey Suresh	100m breaststroke	1:05.19	41	Did not advance			
Harsh Saroha	100m butterfly	56.05	41	Did not advance			
Rohit Beniston Manickaraj	100m butterfly	53.85	22	Did not advance			
Jashua Thomas Durai	100m freestyle	51.45	47	Did not advance			
Srihari Nataraj	100m freestyle	49.46	12Q	49.56	15	Did not advance	
Aditya Dubey	200m breaststroke	2:36.10	39	Did not advance			
Manikanta Lakshmana	200m breaststroke	2:21.80	35	Did not advance			
Shoan Ganguly	200m butterfly	2:04.18	27	Did not advance			
Shubhrant Patra	200m butterfly	2:11.45	34	Did not advance			
Aneesh Sunil Kumar Gowda	200m freestyle	1:52.42	33	Did not advance			
Srihari Nataraj	200m freestyle	1:48.22	5Q	1:48:11	9	Did not advance	
Anurag Singh	200m Individual Medley	2:19.83	38	Did not advance			
Shoan Ganguly	200m Individual Medley	2:05.17	29	Did not advance			
Shivank Vishwanath	400m freestyle	4:06.61	29	Did not advance			
Aneesh Sunil Kumar Gowda	400m freestyle	3:59.45	22	Did not advance			
Anurag Singh	400m Individual Medley	4:54.02	25	Did not advance			
Shoan Ganguly	400m Individual Medley	4:33.56	18	Did not advance			
Rohit Beniston Manickaraj; Shoan Ganguly; Aneesh Sunil Kumar Gowda; Shrungi Rajesh Bandekar	4x100m freestyle relay	3:26.68	17	Did not advance			

Women

Athlete	Event	Heat		Semifinal		Final	
Athlete	Event	Time	Rank	Time	Rank	Time	Rank
Pratyasa Ray	50m backstroke	31.34	23	Did not advance			
Naga Greeshmini Vasupalli	50m breaststroke	34.66	34	Did not advance			
Rithvika Mittapalli	50m breaststroke	34.78	35	Did not advance			
Nina Venkatesh	50m butterfly	28.43	30	Did not advance			
Snigdha Ghosh	50m butterfly	29.24	34	Did not advance			
Pratyasa Ray	100m backstroke	1:06.35	28	Did not advance			
Nilabjaa Ghosh	100m butterfly	1:05.52	31	Did not advance			
Nina Venkatesh	100m butterfly	1:04.49	28	Did not advance			
Latiesha Mandanna	100m freestyle	1:00.54	47	Did not advance			
Nina Venkatesh	100m freestyle	59.58	41	Did not advance			
Pratyasa Ray	200m backstroke	2:24.55	25	Did not advance			
Shrungi Rajesh Bandekar	200m backstroke	2:31.24	27	Did not advance			
Anushka Sayaji Patil	200m breaststroke	2:55.01	34	Did not advance			
Divyanka Dibya Jyoti Pradhan	200m breaststroke	2:47.68	29	Did not advance			
Ashmitha Chandra	200m freestyle	2:13.93	39	Did not advance			
Bhavya Sachdeva	200m freestyle	2:08.88	36	Did not advance			
Jedidah Ajithjeswanthsingh	200m Individual Medley	2:31.34	33	Did not advance			
Shrungi Rajesh Bandekar	200m Individual Medley	2:28.90	31	Did not advance			
Ashmitha Chandra	400m freestyle	4:40.37	35	Did not advance			
Bhavya Sachdeva	400m freestyle	4:28.27	28	Did not advance			
Bhavya Sachdeva	400m Individual Medley	5:17.62	20	Did not advance			
Shrungi Rajesh Bandekar	400m Individual Medley	5:15.90	19	Did not advance			
Snigdha Ghosh; Nina Venkatesh; Latiesha Mandanna; Shrungi Rajesh Bandekar	4x100m freestyle relay	4:06.07	16	Did not advance			
Rithvika Mittapalli; Ashmitha Chandra; Jedidah Ajithjeswanthsingh; Bhavya Sachdeva	4x200m freestyle relay	DNS		Did not advance			

== Table Tennis ==
Singles

Athletes	Event	Group stage			Round of 64	Round of 32	Round of 16	Quarterfinal	Semifinal	Final / BM	
Athletes	Event	Opposition Score	Opposition Score	Rank	Opposition Score	Opposition Score	Opposition Score	Opposition Score	Opposition Score	Opposition Score	Rank
Harkunwar Singh	Men's	(Turkey) Dursun; L 1-3	(Mongolia) Munkhbat; W 3-0	2Q	(Chinese Taipei) Feng; L 0-4	Did not advance to next round					
Chitwan Wadhwa	Men's	(Kyrgyzstan) Moldaliev; L 0-3	(Hungary) Ócsai; L 0-3	3	Did not advance to next round						
Devarsh Waghela	Men's	(Switzerland) Schärrer; L 1-3	(Japan) Tanigaki; L 0-3	3	Did not advance to next round						
Ayaz Murad	Men's	(Poland) Kolasa; L 1-3	(Saudi Arabia) Almutairi; L 2-3	3	Did not advance to next round						
Taneesha Kotecha	Women's	(Lebanon) El Habech; W 3-0	(South Korea) Lee; L 0-3	2Q	(Japan) Omoda; L 2-4	Did not advance to next round					
Suhana Saini	Women's	(Azerbaijan) Mahmudova; W 3-0	(United States) A. Tan; W 3-0	1Q	(Netherlands) Jorguseska; W 4-2	(Chinese Taipei) Chien; L 1-4	Did not advance to next round				
Sayali Wani	Women's	(China) Shang; L 1-3	(Hungary) Laskai; W 3-0	2Q	(China) Yang; L 0-4	Did not advance to next round					
Pritha Vartikar	Women's	(United States) E. Tan; W 3-2	(Colombia) Alzate; W 3-1	1Q	(Turkey) Yilmaz; L 2-4	Did not advance to next round					

Doubles

Athletes	Event	Round of 64	Round of 32	Round of 16	Quarterfinal	Semifinal	Final / BM	
Athletes	Event	Opposition Score	Opposition Score	Opposition Score	Opposition Score	Opposition Score	Opposition Score	Rank
Chitwan Wadhwa; Harkunwar Singh	Men's	(South Korea) Cho / Yun; L 0-3	Did not advance to next round					
Ayaz Murad; Devarsh Vaghela	Men's	(Oman) Al-Shahi / Al Jassasi; W 3-0	(Oman) Picard / Rembert; L 0-3	Did not advance to next round				
Suhana Saini; Pritha Vartikar	Women's	(Singapore) Lai / Tan; L 1-3	Did not advance to next round					
Taneesha Kotecha; Sayali Wani	Women's	(Uzbekistan) Magdieva / Norkulova; W 3-0	(Portugal) Matos / Santos; W 3-0	(France) Cok / Lutz; L WO	Did not advance to next round			
Ayaz Murad; Pritha Vartikar	Mixed	(Thailand) Thanmathikom / Tayapitak; L 0-3	Did not advance to next round					
Harkunwar Singh; Suhana Saini	Mixed	(Macau) Vong / Seak; W WO	(Chinese Taipei) Feng / Tsai; L 0-3	Did not advance to next round				

Team

Athletes	Event	Group stage			Round of 16	Quarterfinal	Semifinal	Final / BM	
Athletes	Event	Opposition Score	Opposition Score	Rank	Opposition Score	Opposition Score	Opposition Score	Opposition Score	Rank
Harkunwar Singh; Ayaz Murad; Devarsh Vaghela; Chitwan Wadhwa	Men's	Japan; L 0-3	Colombia; W 3-2	2Q	China; L 0-3	Did not advance to next round			
Taneesha Kotecha; Suhana Saini; Pritha Vartikar; Sayali Wani	Women's	Romania; L 2-3	Netherlands; W 3-1	2Q	France; W 3-2	Chinese Taipei; L 0-3	Did not advance to next round		

== Taekwondo ==
Men

Athlete	Event	Round of 32	Round of 16	Quarterfinals	Semifinals	Final	
Athlete	Event	Opposition Result	Opposition Result	Opposition Result	Opposition Result	Opposition Result	Rank
Armaan Yadav	–54kg	(Kazakhstan) Duisenbek; L 0–2	Did not advance to next round				
Deepanshu Mehra	–58kg	(Denmark) Fernes; W 2-0	(Chinese Taipei) Pan; L 0–2	Did not advance to next round			
Shivam Shetty	–63kg	(Thailand) Sritimongkol; L 0–2	Did not advance to next round				
Himanshu Saini	–68kg	(France) Lucien; L 0–2	Did not advance to next round				
Shubham Choudhary	–74kg	(Austria) Sahiti; L 0–2	Did not advance to next round				
Vinay Redhu	–80kg	(Cyprus) Charalambous; L 0–2	Did not advance to next round				
Rohit Shokeen	–87kg	(Spain) Akbulut Vico; L 0–2	Did not advance to next round				
Satvinder Singh	+87kg	(Chinese Taipei) Jung; L 0–2	Did not advance to next round				
Himanshu; Armaan Yadav; Satvinder	Team Kyurogi	—N/a	Poland; L 0-2	Did not advance to next round			
Tanishq Pareek	Individual Poomsae	(Australia) Reytomas; L 6.682–8.332	Did not advance to next round				
Aditya Jagarwal; Ehsaas Hota; Kunvardeep Singh	Team Poomsae	—N/a	South Korea; L 7.265–8.966	Did not advance to next round			

Women

Athlete	Event	Round of 32	Round of 16	Quarterfinals	Semifinals	Final	
Athlete	Event	Opposition Result	Opposition Result	Opposition Result	Opposition Result	Opposition Result	Rank
Anika Mittal	–46kg	(Romania) Busuioc; W 2–0	(Germany) Kodaman; W 2–0	(South Korea) Kim; L 0–2	Did not advance to next round		
Twisha Kakadiya	–49kg	(Uzbekistan) Tangirova; L 0–2	Did not advance to next round				
Shivangi Chanambam	–53kg	(Turkey) Taskin; L 0–2	Did not advance to next round				
Anushiya Premraj	-62kg	(Ukraine) Anastasova; L 1–2	Did not advance to next round				
Jyoti Yadav	–67kg	(Italy) Maggiore; L 0–2	Did not advance to next round				
Etisha Das	–73kg	(Germany) Hörmann; L 0–2	Did not advance to next round				
Rishita Dang	+73kg	(Lebanon) Askarjian; W 2–0	(Poland) Haremza; L 0–0	Did not advance to next round			
Anika Mittal; Anushiya Premraj; Jyoti Yadav	Team Kyurogi	Ukraine; L 0-2	Did not advance to next round				
Shanaz Parveen	Individual Poomsae	(Croatia) Jazic; L 8.199–8.599	Did not advance to next round				
Mrunali Harnekar; Geeta Tadav; Khinsan Wangsu	Team Poomsae	—N/a	Ecuador; W 8.249–7.950	—N/a		6.983	7

Mixed

Athlete	Event	Round of 32	Round of 16	Quarterfinals	Semifinals	Final	
Athlete	Event	Opposition Result	Opposition Result	Opposition Result	Opposition Result	Opposition Result	Rank
Deepanshu Mehra; Shivam Shetty; Etisha Das; Twisha Kakadiya	Team Kyurogi	Romania; 23 July; 4:15 PM					
Yash Malinda; Ritu Yadav	Pair Poomsae	(China) Wu / Pan; L 8.199–8.599	Did not advance to next round				

== Tennis ==
Eight athletes from India participated in this event. Vaishnavi Adkar (from Savitribai Phule Pune University) became the first Indian woman tennis player to win a medal in the World University Games by sealing the bronze medal in the Women's individual event. She also broke the 46-year wait for an Indian to win a tennis medal since Nandan Bal's silver in the 1979 games. The mixed doubles pair of Atharva Sharma (from KIIT University) and Vaishnavi Adkar came close but were eliminated in the quarter-finals.

Singles

Athlete	Event	Round of 128	Round of 64	Round of 32	Round of 16	Quarter-final	Semi-final	Final	Rank
Athlete	Event	Opposition Score	Opposition Score	Opposition Score	Opposition Score	Opposition Score	Opposition Score	Opposition Score	Rank
Atharva Sharma	Men's	—N/a		Cons. (Kenya) Shah; L 0-2	Did not advance to next round				
Kabir Hans	Men's	—N/a	(Uzbekistan) Shin; L 1-2	Cons. (Thailand) Majoli Maggioli; W 2-0	Cons. (Switzerland) Schar; L 1-2	Did not advance to next round			
Maan Kesharwani	Men's	—N/a		Cons. (Zimbabwe) Mukwaturi; W 2-0	Cons. (Thailand) Srirat; L 1-2	Did not advance to next round			
Theertha Macherla	Men's	(Switzerland) Stäheli; L 0-2	—N/a	Cons. (South Africa) Fogle; L 0-2	Did not advance to next round				
Anjali Rathi	Women's	—N/a	(Uganda) Owomuhangiuga; W 2-0	(China) Li; L 0-2	Did not advance to next round				
Rutuparna Choudhury	Women's	—N/a		Cons. (Switzerland) Luscher; L 1-2	Did not advance to next round				
Saumya Ronde	Women's	—N/a		Cons. (South Africa) Kleinhans; L 1-2	Did not advance to next round				
Vaishnavi Adkar	Women's	—N/a	(Netherlands) Geels; W 2-0	(Finland) Ahti; W 2-0	(Kenya) Okutoyi; W 2-0	(Germany) Herrmann; W 2-0	(Slovakia) Méri; L 1-3	Did not advance	3rd place, bronze medalist(s)

Doubles

Athlete	Event	Round of 32	Round of 16	Quarter-final	Semi-final	Final	Rank
Athlete	Event	Opposition Score	Opposition Score	Opposition Score	Opposition Score	Opposition Score	Rank
Kabir Hans; Maan Kesharwani	Men's	(Thailand) Majoli Maggioli / Sae-Oui; W 2-0	(Germany) Bischof / Vasquez; L 1-2	Did not advance to next round			
Saumya Ronde; Rutuparna Choudhury	Women's	(Uzbekistan) Olimjonova / Shubina; W 2-1	(Germany) Dittmann / Herrmann; L 0-2	Did not advance to next round			
Vaishnavi Adkar; Atharva Sharma	Mixed	(Colombia) Reina Castillo / González Torres; W 2-0	(United States) Center / Barton; W 2-0	(Japan) Yoshimoto / Friend; L 0-2	Did not advance to next round		

== Volleyball ==
India received a wildcard invitation for the women's tournament. They were unable to win any match and finished last in the competition.

Event	Group stage				9-16 placing	13-16 placing	15-16 placing	
Event	Opposition Score	Opposition Score	Opposition Score	Rank	Opposition Score	Opposition Score	Opposition Score	Rank
Women's Team	Brazil; L 0-3	Poland; L 0-3	Spain; L 0-3	4	Mongolia; L 1-3	Chile; L 0-3	Australia; L 2-3	16
