= Turkey at the 2025 Summer World University Games =

- Flag of Turkey
- IOC code: TUR

in Rhine-Ruhr, Germany 16 July 2025 – 27 July 2025
- Competitors: 144 (70 men and 74 women)
- Medals: Gold 6 Silver 5 Bronze 7 Total 18

Summer World University Games appearances
- 1985; 1987; 1989; 1991; 1993; 1995; 1997; 1999; 2001; 2003; 2005; 2007; 2009; 2011; 2013; 2015; 2017; 2019; 2021; 2025; 2027

Turkey will compete at the 2025 Summer World University Games, which will held from 16 July to 27 July 2025 in Rhine-Ruhr region, Germany. Turkey concluded the 2025 Summer World University Games with a total of 18 medals — 6 gold, 7 silver, and 5 bronze — and ranked 8th overall.

== Medalists ==
Medal	Name	Sport	Event	Day
Gold	Şevval Çakal	Taekwondo	Women's 62 kg	21 July
Gold	Sude Yaren Uzunçavdar	Taekwondo	Women's 73 kg	22 July
Gold	Berke Akçam	Athletics	Men's 400 metres hurdles	23 July
Gold	Özlem Becerek	Athletics	Women's discus throw	24 July
Gold	Batuhan Akçaoğlu; Yakup Yıldız; Yunus Emre Arslan	Archery	Men's compound team	25 July
Gold	Esra Türkmen	Athletics	Women's javelin throw	26 July
Silver	Muhammed Emir Yılmaz	Taekwondo	Men's individual poomsae	17 July
Silver	Ömer Faruk Dayıoğlu	Taekwondo	Men's 63 kg	22 July
Silver	Mert Alkaya; Tuncay Duran	Tennis	Men's doubles	25 July
Silver	Ramazan Baştuğ	Athletics	Men's Half Marathon	26 July
Silver	Azat Demirtaş; Ramazan Baştuğ; Ayetullah Aslanhan; Ömer Amaçtan	Athletics	Men's half marathon team	26 July
Bronze	Berkim Tümer; Berkay Akkoyun; Abdullah Yıldırmış	Archery	Men's recurve team	25 July
Bronze	Berkim Tümer	Archery	Men's recurve individual	26 July
Bronze	Nursena Çeto; Dilek Öztürk; Ezgi Kaya	Athletics	Women's half marathon team	26 July
Bronze	Mert Alkaya; Tuncay Duran	Tennis	Men's team classification	26 July
Bronze	Elis Özbay	Rowing	Women's single sculls	27 July
Bronze	Mehmet Çelik	Athletics	Men's 800 metres	27 July
Bronze	İlyas Çanakçı; Kubilay Ençü; Berke Akçam; İsmail Nezir	Athletics	Men's 4 × 400 metres relay	27 July

Medal by sports

Rank	Sports	Gold	Silver	Bronze	Total
1	Athletics	3	2	3	8
2	Taekwondo	2	2	0	4
3	Archery	1	0	2	3
4	Tennis	0	1	1	2
5	Rowing	0	0	1	1
Totals (5 entries)		6	5	7	18

Source: rhineruhr2025.com

== Competitors ==
Team Turkey have selected a squad of 144 athletes to compete in the 2025 Summer World University Games.

Sport	Men	Women	Total
Archery	6	4	10
Athletics	21	21	42
Badminton	2	2	4
Fencing	3	4	7
Gymnastics	5	5	10
Judo	4	5	9
Rowing	4	1	5
Swimming	5	4	9
Table Tennis	3	3	6
Taekwondo	12	9	21
Tennis	2	2	4
Water polo	0	13	13
Total	70	74	144

== Archery ==
Recurve

Athlete	Event	Ranking round		Round of 128	Round of 64	Round of 32	Round of 16	Quarterfinals	Semifinals	Final / BM	
Athlete	Event	Score	Seed	Opposition Score	Opposition Score	Opposition Score	Opposition Score	Opposition Score	Opposition Score	Opposition Score	Rank
Berkim Tümer	Men's individual	652	18	Bye	Chauhan (IND); W 6-4	Yechan (KOR); W 7-1	Frenkel (ISR); W 7-3	Borsani (ITA); W 6-5	Chih-chun (TPE); L 0-6	Hao (CHN); W 6-4	3rd place, bronze medalist(s)
Berkay Akkoyun	Men's individual	650	20	Bye	Collas (BEL); W 6-4	Wangyu (CHN); L 2-6	Did not advance				17
Abdullah Yıldırmış	Men's individual	644	23	Bye	Choudhary (IND); W 6-2	Borsani (ITA); L 1-7	Did not advance				17
Gizem Özkan	Women's individual	634	25	Bye	Mazlan (MAS); W 6-5	Eun-seo (KOR); W 6-4	Fong (TPE); L 4-6	Did not advance			9
Fatma Maraşlı	Women's individual	612	43	Celan (MDA); W 7-1	Tretiakova (UKR); W 6-0	Sebastian (FRA); L 5-6	Did not advance				17
Defne Derebaşı	Women's individual	596	55	Lum (USA); W 6-4	Klinger (GER); L 5-6	Did not advance					33
Gizem Özkan; Berkim Tümer	Mixed team	1286	10	—N/a		Switzerland; W 6-0	Germany; L 1-5	Did not advance			9
Berkim Tümer; Berkay Akkoyun; Abdullah Yıldırmış	Men's team	1947	6	—N/a		Bye	Poland; W 6-0	China; W 5-4	Japan; L 1-5	Chinese Taipei; W 6-0	3rd place, bronze medalist(s)
Gizem Özkan; Fatma Maraşlı; Defne Derebaşı	Women's team	1842	12	—N/a		Bye	India; L 0-6	Did not advance			9

Compound

Athlete	Event	Ranking round		Round of 64	Round of 32	Round of 16	Quarterfinals	Semifinals	Final / BM	
Athlete	Event	Score	Seed	Opposition Score	Opposition Score	Opposition Score	Opposition Score	Opposition Score	Opposition Score	Rank
Batuhan Akçaoğlu	Men's individual	696	10	Bye	Hoy (CAN); W 148-139	Djie (NED); W 149-143	Flüß (GER); L 145-145	Did not advance		9
Yunus Emre Arslan	Men's individual	693	15	Bye	Conan (SGP); W 148-136	Ting (TPE); W 147-145	Dalal (IND); L 148-148	Did not advance		9
Yakup Yıldız	Men's individual	690	26	Bye	Saharuddin (MAS); W 147-138	Flüß (GER); L 143-145	Did not advance			17
Hazal Burun	Women's individual	681	11	Bye	Kaur (IND); L 144-145	Did not advance				17
Hazal Burun; Batuhan Akçaoğlu	Mixed team	1377	5	—N/a	Bye	Slovenia; W 156-144	Great Britain; L 154-158	Did not advance		6
Batuhan Akçaoğlu; Yunus Emre Arslan; Yakup Yıldız	Men's team	2079	3	—N/a		Croatia; W 229-227	Germany; W 236-225	South Korea; W 236-235	India; W 232-231	1st place, gold medalist(s)

== Taekwondo ==
Men

Athlete	Event	Round of 32	Round of 16	Quarterfinals	Semifinals	Final	
Athlete	Event	Opposition Result	Opposition Result	Opposition Result	Opposition Result	Opposition Result	Rank
Alihan Kuru	54 kg	Mejia (ECU); W 2–0	Mirza (GER); W 2–0	Gun (USA); L 1–2	Did not advance		5
Enes Kaplan	58 kg	Thai (MAS); W 2–0	Kurbonov (UZB); L 1–2	Did not advance			9
Ömer Faruk Dayıoğlu	63 kg	Tsuruoka (JPN); W 2–0	Merdanaj (ALB); W 1–0	Sritimongkol (THA); W 2–0	Borgen (NOR); W 2–0	Ababakirov (KAZ); L 0–2	2nd place, silver medalist(s)
Berkay Erer	68 kg	Frederick (USA); W 2–0	Bystrov (UKR); W 2–1	Yushuai (CHN); L 1–2	Did not advance		5
Ömer Furkan Körpe	74 kg	Mamatov (UKR); W 2–1	Mercer (THA); W 2–1	Matos (BRA); L 0–2	Did not advance		5
Muhammet Enes Şahin	80 kg	Hidri (ALB); W 2–0	Marques (BRA); L 0–2	Did not advance			9
Hüseyin Kartal	87 kg	Lee (KOR); L 0–2	Did not advance				17
Hüseyin Berat Demircioğlu	+87 kg	Bye	Ruderman (ISR); W 2–1	Kablan (KAZ); L 0–2	Did not advance		5
Muhammed Emir Yılmaz	Individual poomsae	Bye	Reytomas (AUS); W 8.799-8.583	—N/a		8.765	2nd place, silver medalist(s)
Muhammed Emir Yılmaz; Yusuf Emre Akbıyık; Furkan Bayrak	Team poomsae	—N/a	China; L 8.816-8.849	Did not advance			
Hüseyin Berat Demircioğlu; Berkay Erer; Ömer Faruk Dayıoğlu	Team Kyorugi	Bye	Uzbekistan; L 0-2	Did not advance			9

Women

Athlete	Event	Round of 32	Round of 16	Quarterfinals	Semifinals	Final	
Athlete	Event	Opposition Result	Opposition Result	Opposition Result	Opposition Result	Opposition Result	Rank
Emine Göğebakan	46 kg	Bye	Yun-seo (KOR); L 1–2	Did not advance			9
Elif Sude Akgül	49 kg	Bye	Okazaki (JPN); W 2–0	Akhmedova (KAZ); L 1–2	Did not advance		5
Zeynep Taşkın	53 kg	Chanambam (IND); W 2–0	Qing (CHN); L 1–1	Did not advance			9
Rüya Diler	57 kg	Zapata (ECU); W 2–0	Mirabzalova (UZB); L 0–2	Did not advance			9
Şevval Çakal	62 kg	Bye	Adilbekkyzy (KAZ); W 2–0	Mina (ECU); W 2–1	Tongchan (THA); W 2–0	Štolbová (CZE); W 2–0	1st place, gold medalist(s)
İkra Kayır	67 kg	Chareewan (THA); W 2–0	Tomczak (POL); W 2–0	Reyes (ESP); L 0–2	Did not advance		5
Sude Yaren Uzunçavdar	73 kg	Bye	Javed (PAK); W 2–0	Makhmutova (KAZ); W 2–0	Oh (KOR); W 2–0	Chaâri (BEL); W 2–0	1st place, gold medalist(s)
Esra Akbulak	+73 kg	Bye	Shvedkova (AIN); L 0–2	Did not advance			9
Gülsena Ertunç	Individual poomsae	Arellano (JPN); L 8.315-8.566	Did not advance				
Esra Akbulak; Rüya Diler; İkra Kayır	Team Kyorugi	Bye	Canada; WO	China; L 0-2	Did not advance		5

Mixed

Athlete	Event	Round of 32	Round of 16	Quarterfinals	Semifinals	Bronze medal match	
Athlete	Event	Opposition Result	Opposition Result	Opposition Result	Opposition Result	Opposition Result	Rank
Gülsena Ertunç; Aykut Taşgın	Pair poomsae	Bye	Singapore; L 8.066–8.282	Did not advance			
Şevval Çakal; Sude Yaren Uzunçavdar; Ömer Furkan Körpe; Hüseyin Berat Demircioğlu	Team kyorugi	Bye	Germany; L 1–2	Did not advance			9

== Water polo ==
Summary

Team	Event	Group stage				Quarterfinal	Classification 5th-8th	Classification	
Team	Event	Opposition Score	Opposition Score	Opposition Score	Rank	Opposition Score	Opposition Score	Opposition Score	Rank
Türkiye women's	Women's tournament	Hungary; L 5–25	Australia; L 10–22	Germany; L 5–24	4	Italy; L 5–20	Australia; L 6–24	Hungary; L 7–25	8
