= Kushal Dalal =

Indian archer (born 2005)

Personal information
- Born: 23 January 2005 (age 21) Sonipat,Haryana, India

Sport
- Country: India
- Sport: Archery
- Event: Compound

Achievements and titles
- Highest world ranking: 11 (25 May 2026)
- Personal best: 714 (2025)
Medal record
Men's compound archery
Representing India
Asian Games
Gold medal – first place	2026 Aichi–Nagoya	Team
Indoor World Series
Gold medal – first place	2025 Strassen	Individual
Asia Cup
Gold medal – first place	2023 Tashkent	Team
Gold medal – first place	2024 Baghdad	Team
Gold medal – first place	2025 Bangkok	Team
Gold medal – first place	2025 Bangkok	Individual
Gold medal – first place	2025 Singapore	Individual
Silver medal – second place	2023 Singapore	Team
Silver medal – second place	2024 Baghdad	Individual
Silver medal – second place	2025 Singapore	Team
Silver medal – second place	2025 Singapore	Mixed team
Bronze medal – third place	2023 Tashkent	Individual
Bronze medal – third place	2024 Suwon	Team
World University Games
Gold medal – first place	2025 Rhine-Ruhr	Mixed team
Silver medal – second place	2025 Rhine-Ruhr	Team
World Youth Championships
Gold medal – first place	2021 Wrocław	Cadet team
Gold medal – first place	2021 Wrocław	Cadet mixed team
Gold medal – first place	2025 Winnipeg	Junior team
Asian Youth Championships
Gold medal – first place	2024 Taipei	Team
Gold medal – first place	2024 Taipei	Mixed team
Bronze medal – third place	2024 Taipei	Individual
- Updated on 30 September 2026

Kushal Dalal (born 23 January 2005) is an Indian compound archer. He has won the gold in the mixed team event and silver in the men's team event at the 2025 World University Games.

== Career ==
=== 2021 ===
Dalal won gold medals in the cadet (under-18) men's compound individual and mixed team events at the 2021 World Archery Youth Championships respectively.

=== 2025 ===
In June 2025, Dalal won the gold medal in the men's compound individual in the Singapore leg of the Asia Cup. In August 2025, he won the gold medal in the junior (under-21) men's team event in the 2025 World Archery Youth Championships at Winnipeg, Canada. He also won his first-ever compound indoor title in the GT Open of the 2025–26 Indoor Series at Strassen, Luxembourg later that year.

In July 2025, Dalal represented India at the 2025 Summer World University Games. He, along with Parneet Kaur, won the compound mixed team gold at the 2025 Summer World University Games, marking the nation's first gold medal at these games.

=== 2026 ===
In May 2026, he qualified for the 2026 Asian Games after finishing in the top three of the men's compound individual selection trials.

== See also ==
- Indian Archers
- Archery in India
