= Sahil Jadhav =

Indian compound archer (born 2001)

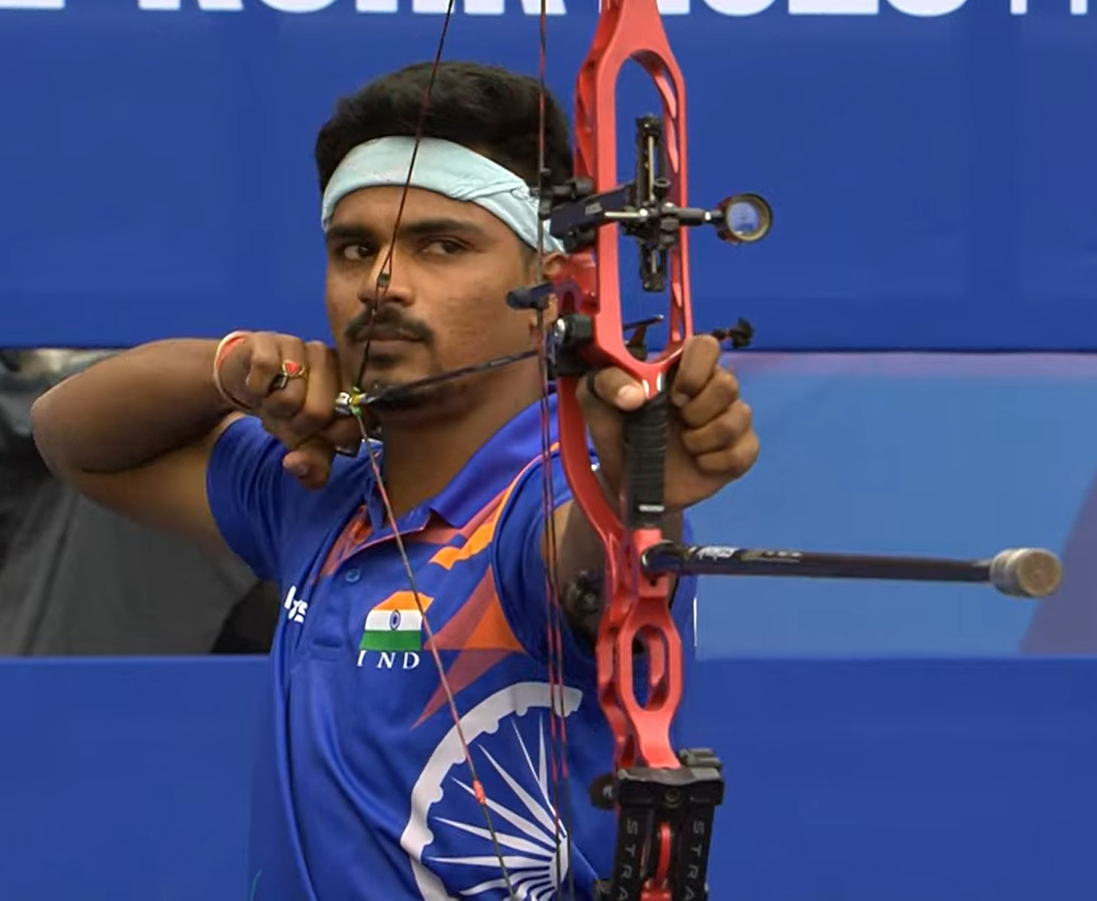
- At the 2025 World University Games

Personal information
- Full name: Sahil Rajesh Jadhav
- Born: 11 April 2001 (age 25) Satara, Maharashtra, India
- Education: Bachelor of Natural Science; Karmaveer Bhaurao Patil University, Satara

Sport
- Country: India
- Sport: Archery
- Event: Compound

Achievements and titles
- Highest world ranking: 18 (25 May 2026)
- Personal best: 711
Medal record
Men's compound archery
Representing India
Asian Games
Gold medal – first place	2026 Aichi–Nagoya	Mixed team
Gold medal – first place	2026 Aichi–Nagoya	Team
Asian Championships
Silver medal – second place	2025 Dhaka	Team
World Cup
Bronze medal – third place	2026 Shanghai	Individual
World University Games
Gold medal – first place	2025 Rhine-Ruhr	Individual
Silver medal – second place	2025 Rhine-Ruhr	Team
- Updated on 30 September 2026

Sahil Rajesh Jadhav (born 11 April 2001) is an Indian compound archer. He has won gold medal in the individual event and silver medal in the team event at the 2025 World University Games.

== Education ==
Jadhav has been pursuing bachelors course on Natural Sciences at Karmaveer Bhaurao Patil University in Satara, Maharashtra.

== Career ==
=== 2025: International debut ===
Jadhav made his international debut at the 2025 Summer World University Games, where he was seeded sixth in the individual category during the rankings round. He, along with Kushal Dalal and Hrithik Sharma, won the silver medal in the men's team event after losing to Turkey by a margin of a point. In the individual event, Jadhav comfortably reached the semis, where he faced his Indian compatriot Dalal and advanced to the final after a stellar near-10 during the shoot-off round. In the gold-medal match, Jadhav hit consecutive 14 arrows and was one arrow away from setting the new FISU Games Record, but his last arrow went for a nine and won the match against Great Britain's Ajay Scott by 149–148. He also won India's first individual gold medal in the 2025 Summer Universiade.

=== 2026: Career breakthrough ===
Jadhav won his maiden Archery World Cup bronze medal in the men's individual compound event in Stage 2 in Shanghai, defeating Denmark's Martin Damsbo by 147–144 after trailing in the opening end.

In May, he qualified for the 2026 Asian Games after finishing first in the men's compound individual selection trials.

== See also ==
- Indian Archers
- Archery in India
