= Rowing at the 2025 Summer World University Games =

Rowing competition at the 2025 Summer World University Games

- Venue: Regattabahn Duisburg
- Date: 25–27 July 2025

Rowing at the 2025 Summer World University Games was held at the Regattabahn Duisburg in Duisburg, Germany from 25 to 27 July 2025.

== Medal table ==
* Host nation (Germany)

Rank	Nation	Gold	Silver	Bronze	Total
1	Great Britain	3	1	1	5
2	Netherlands	2	2	2	6
3	Italy	2	2	1	5
4	Lithuania	2	0	2	4
5	Czech Republic	1	0	1	2
6	Moldova	1	0	0	1
7	Germany*	0	3	0	3
8	Poland	0	1	1	2
9	Croatia	0	1	0	1
9	South Africa	0	1	0	1
11	New Zealand	0	0	1	1
11	Turkey	0	0	1	1
11	United States	0	0	1	1
Totals (13 entries)		11	11	11	33

== Medalists ==
=== Men ===
Event	Gold	Silver	Bronze
Single sculls	Ivan Corsunov; Moldova	Joshua Knight; Great Britain	Arnedas Kelmelis; Lithuania
Coxless pair	Lithuania; Domantas Stankūnas; Dovydas Stankūnas	Italy; Paolo Covini; Alessandro Gardino	Great Britain; Toby Lassen; Felix Rawlinson
Double sculls	Netherlands; Nicolaas Dirkzwager; Adam Street	Croatia; Karlo Borković; Goran Mahmutović	Italy; Andrea Pazzagli; Edoardo Rocchi
Coxless four	Netherlands; Kevin-Lee Bieshaar; Thomas Driessen; Pepijn Ermstrang; Reinier Vriens	Italy; Matteo Giorgetti; Francesco Graffione; Tommasso Rossi; Ermanno Virgilio	Czech Republic; Krystof Blaha; Radim Hönig; Jan Lasota; Martin Pfeifer
Eight	Great Britain; Zahir Ala; Lucas Bowes; Benjamin Brockway; Joshua Burke; Samuel Ford; Maximilian Mills; Finn Mosedale; Benedict Newton; Edward Ridley	Poland; Emilian Jackowiak; Jerzy Kaczmarek; Kazimir Kujda; Magdalena Ladna; Tomek Lewicki; Jakub Sobański; Bartłomiej Soponski; Oskar Streich; Szymon Tomiak	Netherlands; Bart Berbers; Floris Bij de Weg; Lancelot Bloemen; Hanne Gielliet; Bart Lauwers; Samuel Meijdam; Bastiaan van Gerwen; Joppe Visch; Jaap Worm

=== Women ===
Event	Gold	Silver	Bronze
Single sculls	Anna Šantrůčková; Czech Republic	Alexandra Föster; Germany	Elis Özbay; Turkey
Coxless pair	Lithuania; Ugnė Juzėnaitė; Kamilė Kralikaitė	South Africa; Courtney Westley; Katherine Williams	New Zealand; Frances Casey; Isobel Eliadis-Watson
Double sculls	Italy; Sara Borghi; Elena Sali	Netherlands; Iris van den Berg; Jessy Vermeer	Poland; Barbara Jęchorek; Wiktoria Kalinowska
Coxless four	Great Britain; Sarah Marshall; Zoe McCutcheon; Phoebe Snowden; Holly Youd	Germany; Luise Bachmann; Olivia Clotten; Paula Hartmann; Lene Mührs	Netherlands; Isa Dignum; Lydia Knevel; Vera Versteegh; Nienke von Hebel
Eight	Great Britain; Beatrice Argyle; Daisy Faithfull; Sophia Issberner; Daisy Jackson; Tia Lenihan; Sarah Marshall; Zoe McCutcheon; Phoebe Snowden; Holly Youd	Netherlands; Fenna Beukema; Sanne de Kleijn; Sophie Goldschmeding; Lotte Jansen; Martine Kamminga; Rowin Morsinkhof; Fréderique Pals; Evie Rademaker; Anna Sanders	United States; Leah Brannon; Taylor Denger; Tiara Dye; Sabrina Gottschalk; Ashley Johnson; Katherine Myers; Lindsey Troftgruben; Ryleigh White; Lilian Wilhelm

=== Mixed ===
Event	Gold	Silver	Bronze
Quadruple sculls	Italy; Lorenzo Baldo; Martina Fanfani; Alice Ramella; Tommaso Vianello	Germany; Helena Brenke; Sydney Grabers; Oskar Kroglowski; Tjorven Schneider	Lithuania; Rokas Jakubauskas; Agne Kubaityte; Justas Kuskevicius; Ugnė Sakickaite
