= 2026 Indoor Archery World Series =

International archery competition

2025-26 Indoor Archery World Series
- League: Indoor Archery World Series
- Sport: Archery
- Duration: 31 October 2025 – 29 March 2026

Seasons
- ← 2024-25 2026-27 →

The 2025-26 Indoor Archery World Series is the eighth edition of Indoor Archery World Series, organised by the World Archery Federation. It consists of seven events and is currently being held from 31 October 2025 to 29 March 2026.

The calendar starting from November 2025 consists of seven rounds beginning with Swiss Open at Lausanne, Switzerland from 31 October to 2 November 2025. The next six rounds are at Strassen, Taoyuan City, Rio de Janeiro, Nimes, Merida and Las Vegas. The last round was scheduled from 26 to 29 March 2026.

== Results ==
=== Recurve ===
==== Men (Senior) ====
Stage	Venue	1st place, gold medalist(s)	2nd place, silver medalist(s)	3rd place, bronze medalist(s)
1	(Switzerland) Lausanne	(Switzerland) Keziah Chabin	(Israel) Roy Dror	(Netherlands) Willem Bakker
2	(Luxembourg) Strassen			
3	(Chinese Taipei) Taipei			
4	(Brazil) Rio de Janeiro			
5	(France) Nimes			
6	(Mexico) Mérida	Matias Grande; Mexico	Nicholas D'Amour; United States	Juan Pablo Téllez; Mexico
7	(United States) Vegas			

==== Women (Senior) ====
Stage	Venue	1st place, gold medalist(s)	2nd place, silver medalist(s)	3rd place, bronze medalist(s)
1	(Switzerland) Lausanne	(Czech Republic) Marie Horáčková	(Italy) Lucilla Boari	(Italy) Roberta Di Francesco
2	(Luxembourg) Strassen			
3	(Chinese Taipei) Taipei			
4	(Brazil) Rio de Janeiro			
5	(France) Nimes			
6	(Mexico) Mérida	Angela Ruiz; Mexico	Alejandra Valencia; Mexico	Ana Luiza Caetano; Brazil
7	(United States) Vegas			

==== Men (Under-21) ====
Stage	Venue	1st place, gold medalist(s)	2nd place, silver medalist(s)	3rd place, bronze medalist(s)
1	(Switzerland) Lausanne	(Moldova) Andrei Belici	(Switzerland) Noé Wenger	(Slovakia) Matej Kuchar
2	(Luxembourg) Strassen			
3	(Chinese Taipei) Taipei			
4	(Brazil) Rio de Janeiro			
5	(France) Nimes			
6	(Mexico) Mérida	Gabriel Alberto Jaramillo; Mexico	Leonardo Pacheco; Mexico	Patricio Alberto Zazueta Zamora; Mexico
7	(United States) Vegas			

==== Women (Under-21) ====
Stage	Venue	1st place, gold medalist(s)	2nd place, silver medalist(s)	3rd place, bronze medalist(s)
1	(Switzerland) Lausanne	(France) Justine Cellier	(Germany) Fiona Marquardt	(Slovakia) Kristína Drusková
2	(Luxembourg) Strassen			
3	(Chinese Taipei) Taipei			
4	(Brazil) Rio de Janeiro	Yareni Miranda Chab Quintal; Mexico	Isis Yaretzi Gutierrez Munoz; Mexico	Sayuri Celeste Celis Soto; Mexico
5	(France) Nimes			
6	(Mexico) Mérida			
7	(United States) Vegas			

=== Compound ===
==== Men (Senior) ====
Stage	Venue	1st place, gold medalist(s)	2nd place, silver medalist(s)	3rd place, bronze medalist(s)
1	(Switzerland) Lausanne	Ajay Scott; United Kingdom	Nicolas Girard; France	Marco Morello; Italy
2	(Luxembourg) Strassen			
3	(Chinese Taipei) Taipei			
4	(Brazil) Rio de Janeiro			
5	(France) Nimes			
6	(Mexico) Mérida	Mathias Fullerton; Denmark	Miguel Becerra; Mexico	Mike Schloesser; Netherlands
7	(United States) Vegas			

==== Women (Senior) ====
Stage	Venue	1st place, gold medalist(s)	2nd place, silver medalist(s)	3rd place, bronze medalist(s)
1	(Switzerland) Lausanne	(Italy) Aloisi Francesca	(Italy) Elisa Roner	(Belgium) Sarah Prieels
2	(Luxembourg) Strassen			
3	(Chinese Taipei) Taipei			
4	(Brazil) Rio de Janeiro			
5	(France) Nimes			
6	(Mexico) Mérida			
7	(United States) Vegas			

==== Men (Under-21) ====
Stage	Venue	1st place, gold medalist(s)	2nd place, silver medalist(s)	3rd place, bronze medalist(s)
1	(Switzerland) Lausanne	(Moldova) Andrei Belici	(Switzerland) Noé Wenger	(Slovakia) Matej Kuchar
2	(Luxembourg) Strassen			
3	(Chinese Taipei) Taipei			
4	(Brazil) Rio de Janeiro			
5	(France) Nimes			
6	(Mexico) Mérida			
7	(United States) Vegas			

==== Women (Under-21) ====
Stage	Venue	1st place, gold medalist(s)	2nd place, silver medalist(s)	3rd place, bronze medalist(s)
1	(Switzerland) Lausanne	(France) Justine Cellier	(Germany) Fiona Marquardt	(Slovakia) Kristína Drusková
2	(Luxembourg) Strassen			
3	(Chinese Taipei) Taipei			
4	(Brazil) Rio de Janeiro			
5	(France) Nimes			
6	(Mexico) Mérida			
7	(United States) Vegas			
