= Indoor Archery World Series =

Annual international archery competitions

- Start date: October
- End date: March

The Indoor Archery World Series is an annual indoor archery circuit founded by World Archery as a replacement competition for the World Indoor Archery Championships. The winners of the various categories are awarded cash prizes, while the overall circuit winner is recognized at the season-ending Finals. Over the years, further subgroups of the two main bow types that characterized the competitions have been added. The calendar includes seven stages held across Europe, Asia, South America, and North America. These events can be worth 250 or 1,000 points for the stage winner, establishing a points ranking that will determine the overall winner, as the Finals was eliminated in 2026.

== Roll of Honor ==
Season	Man		Women	
Season	Recurve	Compound	Recurve	Compound
Title awarded through Finals
2018	(Netherlands) Steve Wijler	(United States) Kris Schaff	(South Korea) Sim Yeji	(Russia) Victoria Balzhanova
2019-2020	(Germany) Florian Unruh	(Netherlands) Mike Schloesser	(South Korea) Wi Nayeon	(United States) Paige Pearce
2021	(South Korea) Oh Jin Hyek	(Mexico) Jesus Sanchez	(United States) Casey Kaufhold	(United Kingdom) Ella Gibson
2022	(Germany) Felix Wieser	(France) Nicolas Girard	(United Kingdom) Penny Healey	(Slovenia) Toja Ellison
2023	(Netherlands) Steve Wijler (2)	(United States) Bodie Turner	(South Korea) Duna Lim	(Italy) Elisa Roner
2024	(United States) Brady Ellison	(United States) James Lutz	(Germany) Michelle Kroppen	(Italy) Elisa Roner (2)
2025	(United States) Brady Ellison (2)	(Austria) Nico Wiener	(United States) Casey Kaufhold (2)	(Denmark) Tanja Gellenthien
Title awarded through ranking
2026				

== Locations ==
Nation (tot)	City (total)	18	19	21	22	23	24	25	26
China (2)	Macao (2)	●	●						
Australia (1)	Sydney (1)		●						
Brazil (1)	Rio de Janeiro (1)								●
South Korea (1)	Seoul (1)	●							
France (8)	Nimes (8)	●	●	●	●	●	●	●	●
Italy (2)	Roma (2)	●	●						
Luxembourg (6)	Strassen (6)	●	●			●	●	●	●
Mexico (1)	Mérida (1)								●
United States (15)	Chicago (1)							●	
United States (15)	Yankton (1)			●					
United States (15)	Las Vegas (13)	●+F	●+F		●+F	●+F	●+F	●+F	●
Switzerland (5)	Losanna (4)			●			●	●	●
Switzerland (5)	Wohlen (1)			●					
Chinese Taipei (4)	Taipei (3)					●	●	●	
Chinese Taipei (4)	Taoyuan (1)								●
Stages completed online (4)				4					
Total stages per edition		7	7	8	3	5	6	7	7
