= Shanaz Parveen =

India Taekwondo athlete (born 1999)

Personal information
- Born: 1 January 2002 Sankoo, Kargil

Sport
- Country: India
- Sport: Taekwondo

Shanaz Parveen is an Indian Taekwondo athlete. The first woman to bag a national-level gold from Ladakh, she went on to represent India at the FISU World University Games in Chengdu and Rhine-Rhur.

== Early life ==
Shanaz was born was born in Sankoo, a hamlet near Kargil, India. She has a brother and three sisters, one of whom is a football player. Parveen was herself drawn to takewondo after watching girls her age participate in a workshop held at her school. She described her fascination with the sport, saying she was captivated by the idea of "girls kicking and partaking in combat sports".

== Career ==
Parveen was active in sports throughout her school years, actively participating in badminton and other takewondo. Deciding to pursue a career in the latter, she began receiving formal training. She learnt the basics of the sport from local coach Mohd Ali, before shifting her training base to Jammu. Under the tutelage of Atul Pangotra, she began winning medals at local and district-level tournaments. Her big breakthrough came in 2023 when she won a gold medal at the National University Games. By doing so, Parveen became the first woman from the Union Territory of Ladakh to win a national-level medal in taekwondo.

Enrolled at the Maharshi Dayanand University, Rohtak, Parveen was selected for the squad that participated at the World University Games in Chengdu, China in August 2023. The first woman from Ladakh to play at the World University Games, she made the last-eight at the tournament. “Even though I lost in the quarterfinals, it was the biggest learning experience. I got to don the India blazer and watched so many accomplished athletes perform well and learn from them,” she said of her experience at Chengdu. Representing India at the 2024 Asian Taekwondo Poomsae Championship held in Vietnam, she made another deep run at an international event, reaching the quarterfinals.

Parveen continued to do well in the domestic circuit, winning the gold medal at the 2025 Federation Cup Taekwondo National Championship held in Nasik, Maharashtra. She and fellow taekwondo player, Sonam Chosphal, were felicitated by the Ladakh administration following their performance. In the same year, Pavreen would again make the cut for the World University Games played in Rhine-Rhur, Germany. Carrying an injury though, she crashed out in a closely contested round-of-32 encounter.
