= Tamara Artić =

Croatian rhythmic gymnast (born 2004)

Tamara Artic
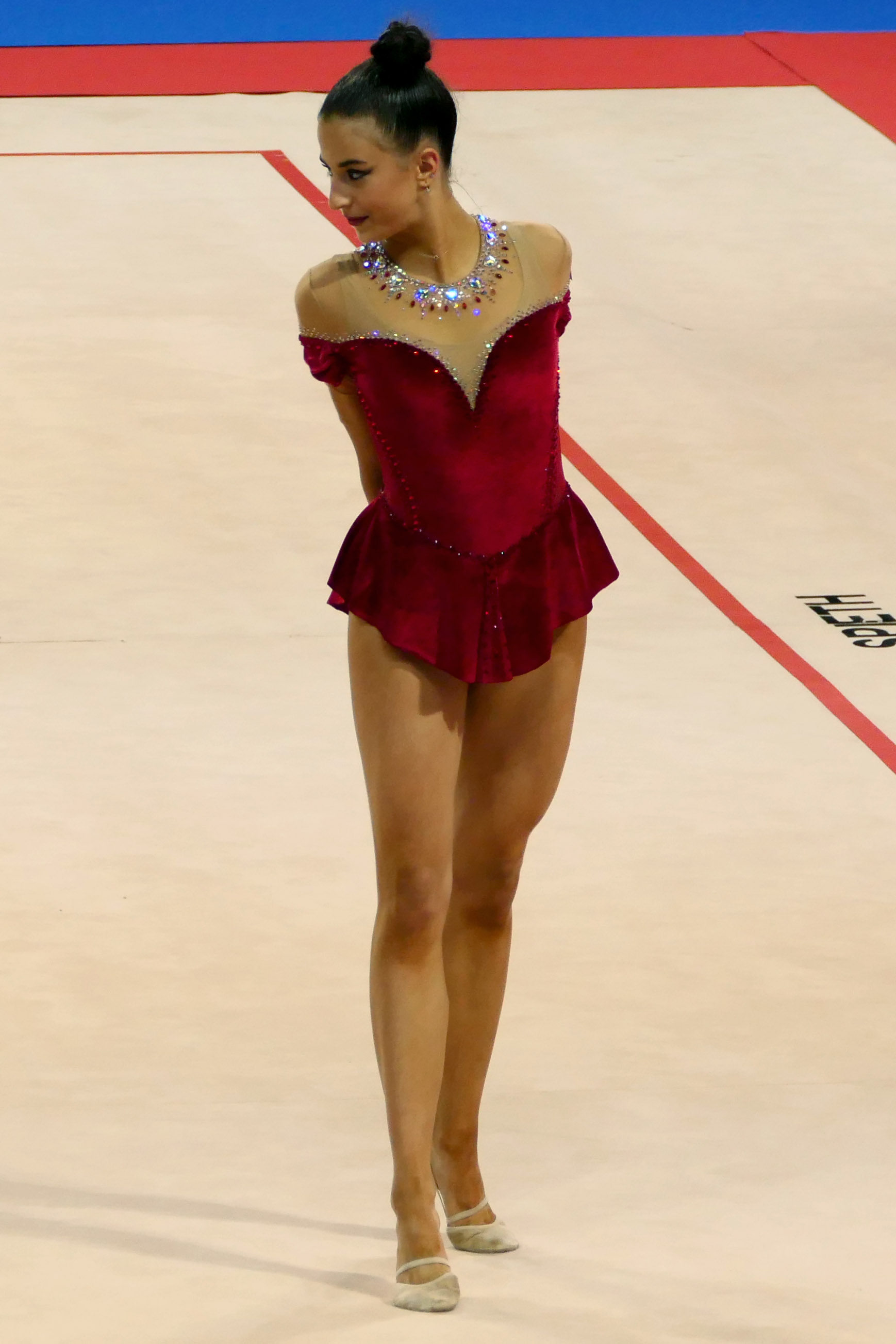

Personal information
- Born: 1 December 2004 (age 21) Varaždin, Croatia

Gymnastics career
- Discipline: Rhythmic gymnastics
- Country represented: Croatia; (2017-)
- Club: GK Vindija Varaždin
- Head coach: Rea Strnad

Tamara Artic (born 1 December 2004) is a Croatian rhythmic gymnast. She represents Croatia in international competitions

== Career ==
Artic took up the sport in kindergarten, when coaches came to her school to scout for potential athletes. In 2016 she won gold among pre juniors at the Croatian Championships.

She became a junior in 2017, winning gold in the All-Around, with hoop, with ball and with ribbon at nationals. In November she took part in the Happy Cup in Ghent, being 11th overall and 5th with hoop.

In 2018 she kept her national title, being then called up for her maiden European Championships. In Guadalajara she was 35th with hoop, 33rd with clubs and 60th with ribbon. In April 2019 she won All-Around gold at the Croatian Championships, and was selected for the 1st Junior World Championships in Moscow, finishing 53rd with ball, 40th with clubs and 38th with ribbon.

In 2021, as a senior, she competed in the World Cup in Sofia where she took 55th place in the All-Around, 50th with hoop, 47th with ball, 58th with clubs and 57th with ribbon. At the European Championships in Varna she was 52nd overall, 55th with ball, 46th with clubs and 50th with ribbon.

At the 2022 Croatian Championships she won four golds, being the most successful gymnast in the competition. At the World Cup in Pesaro she took 28th place in the All-Around. She then performed at the European Championships in Tel Aviv, being 41st in the All-Around, 51st with hoop, 26th with clubs and 30th with ribbon. In the World Challenge Cup in Cluj-Napoca she was 38th in the All-Around. Being selected for the World Championships in Sofia she took 51st place in the All-Around, 68th with hoop, 56th with ball, 47th with clubs and 47th with ribbon.

In 2023 she was 44th at the World Cup in Sofia. In Portimão she was 46th overall. At the European Championships in Baku she took 44th place in the All-Around, 52nd with hoop, 40th with ball, 40th with clubs and 65th with ribbon. In Cluj-Napoca she was 44th in the All-Around. In August she participated in the World Championships in Valencia, being 67th in the All-Around, 67th with hoop, 59th with ball, 65th with clubs and 70th with ribbon.

At the 2024 World Cup in Sofia she was 41st in the All-Around, 35th with hoop, 43rd with ball, 46th with clubs and 44th with ribbon. A month later, in Portimão, she took 26th place in the All-Around, 23rd with hoop, 37th with ball, 21st with clubs and 25th with ribbon. She then retained her national champion title. At the European Championships in Budapest she finished 40th overall, 49th with hoop, 40th with ball, 40th with clubs and 35th with ribbon.

In 2025 she debuted in the World Cup in Sofia, being 56th overall, 80th with hoop, 45th with ball, 37th with clubs and 60th with ribbon. At the stage in Portimão she was 35th in the All-Around, 39th with hoop, 30th with ball, 42nd with clubs and 35th with ribbon. In June she participated part in the European Championships in Tallinn, being 33rd in the All-Around, 27th with hoop, 38th with ball, 31st with clubs and 46th with ribbon. In July she took part in the University Games, there she was 34th overall, 27th with hoop, 34th with ball, 19th with clubs and 41st with ribbon. In Cluj-Napoca she took 45th place in the All-Around. In August she was selected for the World Championships in Rio de Janeiro, finishing 47th in the All-Around, 37th with hoop, 54th with ball, 57with clubs and 40th with ribbon.

== Routine music information ==
| Year | Apparatus | Music title |
|---|---|---|
| 2025 | Hoop | Brothers In Arms by Junkie XL |
| 2025 | Ball | |
| 2025 | Clubs | Rim Tim Tagi Dim by Baby Lasagna |
| 2025 | Ribbon | Overture/And All That Jazz by Catherine Zeta-Jones, Renée Zellweger & Taye Diggs |
| 2024 | Hoop | |
| 2024 | Ball | |
| 2024 | Clubs | |
| 2024 | Ribbon | |
| 2023 | Hoop | Deadwood by Really Slow Motion |
| 2023 | Ball | Oh, Pretty Woman by Roy Orbison |
| 2023 | Clubs | Survivor by 2WEI |
| 2023 | Ribbon | Uptown Funk by Mark Ronson ft. Bruno Mars |
