= Netherlands at the 2025 Summer World University Games =

- Flag of the Netherlands
- IOC code: NED
- National federation: Studentensport Nederland

in Rhine-Ruhr, Germany 16 July 2025 – 27 July 2025
- Medals Ranked 22nd: Gold 2 Silver 4 Bronze 2 Total 8

Summer World University Games appearances
- 1959; 1961; 1963; 1965; 1967; 1970; 1973; 1975; 1977; 1979; 1981; 1983; 1985; 1987; 1989; 1991; 1993; 1995; 1997; 1999; 2001; 2003; 2005; 2007; 2009; 2011; 2013; 2015; 2017; 2019; 2021; 2025; 2027

Netherlands competed at the 2025 Summer World University Games in Rhine-Ruhr, Germany held from 16 to 27 July 2025. Netherlands took twenty-second place in the medal table with 8 medals.

== Medal summary ==
=== Medal by sports ===
Rank	Sports	Gold	Silver	Bronze	Total
1	Rowing	2	2	2	6
2	Beach volleyball	0	2	0	2
Totals (2 entries)		2	4	2	8

Source: rhineruhr2025.com

=== Medalists ===
Medal	Name	Sport	Event	Date
Gold	Nicolaas Dirkzwager; Adam Street	Rowing	Men's double sculls	27 July
Gold	Reinier Vriens; Thomas Driessen; Pepijn Ermstrang; Kevin-Lee Bieshaar	Rowing	Men's four	27 July
Silver	Nigella Negenman; Floor Hogenhout	Beach volleyball	Women	26 July
Silver	Quinten Groenewold; Tom Sonneville	Beach volleyball	Men	26 July
Silver	Jessy Vermeer; Iris van den Berg	Rowing	Women's double sculls	27 July
Silver	Martine Kamminga; Fréderique Pals; Fenna Beukema; Evie Rademaker; Sanne de Kleijn; Rowin Morsinkhof; Sophie Goldschmeding; Anna Sanders; Lotte Jansen	Rowing	Women's eight	27 July
Bronze	Isa Dignum; Vera Versteegh; Nienke van Hebel; Lydia Knevel	Rowing	Women's four	27 July
Bronze	Bastiaan van Gerwen; Jaap Worm; Hanne Gielliet; Samuel Meijdam; Lancelot Bloemen; Bart Berbers; Floris bij de Weg; Bart Lauwers; Joppe Visch	Rowing	Men's eight	27 July
