= Yunus Emre Arslan =

Turkish compound archer (born 2005)

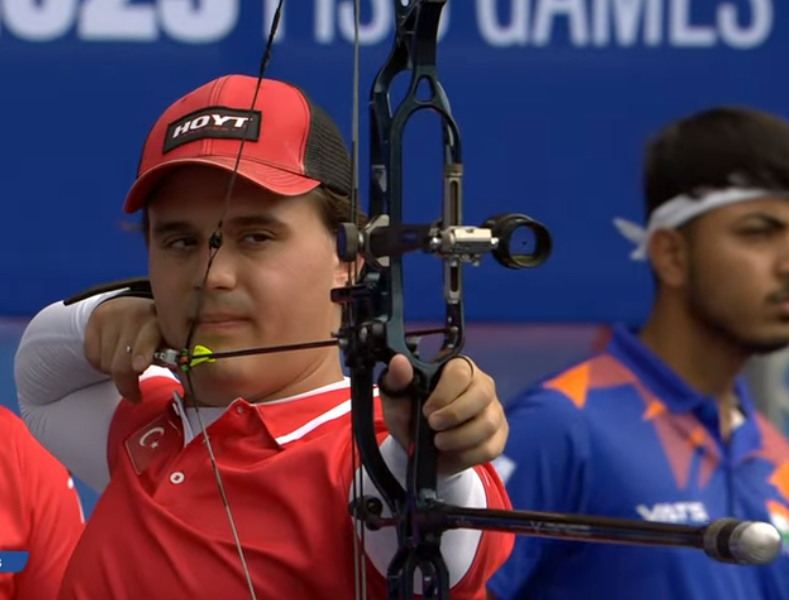
- At the 2025 Summer World University Games

Personal information
- Nationality: Turkish
- Born: 28 May 2005 (age 21) Turkey
- Home town: Kayseri, Turkey
- Education: Erciyes University

Sport
- Country: Turkey
- Sport: Archery
- Event: Compound
- Team: Kayseri BBSK
Medal record
Men's Archery
Representing Turkey
FISU World University Games
Gold medal – first place	2025 Essen	Team
World Youth Championships
Bronze medal – third place	2021 Wrocław	Team
European Youth Championships
Bronze medal – third place	2022 Lilleshall	U18 Individual
Silver medal – second place	2022 Lilleshall	U18 Team

Yunus Emre Arslan (born 28 May 2005) is a Turkish male compound archer and part of the national team.

== Personal life ==
Arslan studies at Erciyes University in Kayseri.

== Sport career ==
Arslan started his sport career on the recommendation of his archer cousin, entering Kayseri Metropolitan Municipality Sports Club at the age of 12. His efforts attracted his coach, who guided him to participate at the national selections. So, he was admiitted to the national team, and won around 40 medals.

He won the bronze medal in the cadet team event with Abdullah Aslım and Eren Kırca at the 2021 World Archery Youth Championships held in Wrocław, Poland.

At the 2022 European Youth Championships in Lilleshall, Great Britain, he won the bronze medal in the compound U18 individ event and the silver medal in compound U18 team event with Batuhan Akçaoğlu, Toprak Efe Çoban and Yakup Yıldız. At the same competition, he was part of the team including Yusuf Bahadır Eryılmaz and Eren Kırca, which set a new world record in outdoor 50 m compound boys U18 team event with 2,109 points on 18 August 2022 The former record of 2,107 points belonged to the United States team.

He won the gold medal in the compound team event with Batuhan Akçaoğlu and Yakup Yıldız at the 2025 Summer World University Games in Essen, Germany.
