= Sportpark am Hallo =

Sports venue in Essen, Germany

Coordinates: 51°28′31″N 7°2′50″E

Sportpark am Hallo is a facility consisting of an indoor sporting arena and an outdoor stadium located in Essen, Germany. The capacity of the arena is 2,500 people, while the stadium can accommodate 3,800 spectators. It is home to the Assindia Cardinals (American Football), ETB Essen (basketball) and TUSEM Essen (handball).
