= Great Britain at the 2025 Summer World University Games =

- Flag of Great Britain
- IOC code: GBR
- National federation: British Universities & Colleges Sport

in Rhine-Ruhr, Germany 16 July 2025 – 27 July 2025
- Competitors: 133 in 11 sports
- Flag bearers: Eliz Maloney (tennis); James Jeal (fencing)
- Medals Ranked 12th: Gold 4 Silver 8 Bronze 6 Total 18

Summer World University Games appearances
- 1959; 1961; 1963; 1965; 1967; 1970; 1973; 1975; 1977; 1979; 1981; 1983; 1985; 1987; 1989; 1991; 1993; 1995; 1997; 1999; 2001; 2003; 2005; 2007; 2009; 2011; 2013; 2015; 2017; 2019; 2021; 2025; 2027

Great Britain competed at the 2025 Summer World University Games in Rhine-Ruhr, Germany held from 16–27 July 2025. Great Britain was represented by 133 athletes and took twelfth place in the medal table with 18 medals. Eliz Maloney (tennis) and James Jeal (fencing) became the flag bearers.

== Medal summary ==
=== Medal by sports ===
Rank	Sports	Gold	Silver	Bronze	Total
1	Rowing	3	1	1	5
2	Artistic gymnastics	1	0	0	1
3	Athletics	0	3	2	5
4	Tennis	0	2	1	3
5	Archery	0	1	1	2
6	3x3 wheelchair basketball	0	1	0	1
7	Taekwondo	0	0	1	1
Totals (7 entries)		4	8	6	18

Source: rhineruhr2025.com

=== Medalists ===
Medal	Name	Sport	Event	Date
Gold	Luke Whitehouse	Artistic gymnastics	Men's floor exercise	26 July
Gold	Sarah Marshall; Phoebe Snowden; Zoe McCutcheon; Holly Youd	Rowing	Women's four	27 July
Gold	Sarah Marshall; Holly Youd; Beatrice Argyle; Daisy Faithfull; Sophia Issberner; Tia Lenihan; Daisy Jackson; Phoebe Snowden; Zoe McCutcheon	Rowing	Women's eight	27 July
Gold	Edward Ridley; Josh Burke; Zahir Ala; Max Mills; Finn Mosedale; Ben Newton; Ben Brockway; Lucas Bowes; Sam Ford	Rowing	Men's eight	27 July
Silver	James Hazell; Alexander Marshall-Wilson; Shayne Humphries; William Bishop	3x3 wheelchair basketball	Men's wheelchair	20 July
Silver	David Mullarkey	Athletics	Men's 10,000m	23 July
Silver	Ajay Scott	Archery	Men's individual compound	26 July
Silver	David Mullarkey	Athletics	Men's 5000m	26 July
Silver	Toby Samuel; Rahul Dhokia; James Connel	Tennis	Men's team	26 July
Silver	Toby Samuel	Tennis	Men's singles	26 July
Silver	Sarah Calvert	Athletics	Women's 1500m	27 July
Silver	Josh Knight	Rowing	Men's single sculls	27 July
Bronze	Matthew Howell	Taekwondo	Men -68kg	19 July
Bronze	Samuel Charig	Athletics	Men's 1500m	24 July
Bronze	James Connel	Tennis	Men's singles	24 July
Bronze	Hallie Boulton; Ajay Scott	Archery	Mixed team compound	25 July
Bronze	Emily Parker	Athletics	Women's 5000m	26 July
Bronze	Toby Lassen; Felix Rawlinson	Rowing	Men's pair	27 July
