= Kazakhstan at the 2025 Summer World University Games =

- Flag of Kazakhstan
- IOC code: KAZ
- National federation: Student Sports Federation of the Republic of Kazakhstan

in Rhine-Ruhr, Germany 16 July 2025 – 27 July 2025
- Competitors: 76 in 12 sports
- Flag bearer: Batyrkhan Toleugali (taekwondo)
- Medals Ranked 37th: Gold 1 Silver 0 Bronze 10 Total 11

Summer World University Games appearances
- 1959; 1961; 1963; 1965; 1967; 1970; 1973; 1975; 1977; 1979; 1981; 1983; 1985; 1987; 1989; 1991; 1993; 1995; 1997; 1999; 2001; 2003; 2005; 2007; 2009; 2011; 2013; 2015; 2017; 2019; 2021; 2025; 2027

Kazakhstan competed at the 2025 Summer World University Games in Rhine-Ruhr, Germany held from 16 to 27 July 2025. Kazakhstan was represented by 76 athletes and took thirty-seventh place in the medal table with eleven medals. Batyrkhan Toleugali (taekwondo) was a flag bearer at the opening ceremony.

== Medal summary ==
=== Medal by sports ===
| Rank | Sports | Gold | Silver | Bronze | Total |
|---|---|---|---|---|---|
| 1 | Taekwondo | 1 | 0 | 7 | 8 |
| 2 | Judo | 0 | 0 | 2 | 2 |
| 3 | Rhythmic gymnastics | 0 | 0 | 1 | 1 |
| Totals (3 entries) | | 1 | 0 | 10 | 11 |

Source: rhineruhr2025.com

=== Medalists ===
| Medal | Name | Sport | Event | Date |
|---|---|---|---|---|
| Gold | Samirkhon Ababakirov | Taekwondo | Men -63kg | 22 July |
| Bronze | Aibota Yertaikyzy | Rhythmic gymnastics | Individual ribbon | 19 July |
| Bronze | Damir Shulenov | Taekwondo | Men -68kg | 19 July |
| Bronze | Nodira Akhmedova | Taekwondo | Women -49kg | 20 July |
| Bronze | Tamirlan Tleules | Taekwondo | Men -58kg | 20 July |
| Bronze | Batyrkhan Toleugali | Taekwondo | Men -80kg | 20 July |
| Bronze | Beibarys Kablan | Taekwondo | Men +87kg | 21 July |
| Bronze | Aman Bakytzhan | Judo | Men -60 kg | 23 July |
| Bronze | Nurkanat Serikbayev | Judo | Men -66 kg | 23 July |
| Bronze | Mariya Sevostyanova; Nuray Khussainova; Aisha Adilbekkyzy | Taekwondo | Women's team kyorugi | 23 July |
| Bronze | Samirkhon Ababakirov; Nazym Makhmutova; Aidana Sundetbay; Beibarys Kablan | Taekwondo | Mixed team kyorugi | 23 July |
