= Croatia at the 2025 Summer World University Games =

- Flag of Croatia
- IOC code: CRO
- National federation: Croatian Academic Sports Federation

in Rhine-Ruhr, Germany 16 July 2025 – 27 July 2025
- Competitors: 55 in 8 sports
- Flag bearers: Leon Hrgota (taekwondo); Tamara Artić (rhythmic gymnastics)
- Medals Ranked 45th: Gold 0 Silver 2 Bronze 2 Total 4

Summer World University Games appearances
- 1959; 1961; 1963; 1965; 1967; 1970; 1973; 1975; 1977; 1979; 1981; 1983; 1985; 1987; 1989; 1991; 1993; 1995; 1997; 1999; 2001; 2003; 2005; 2007; 2009; 2011; 2013; 2015; 2017; 2019; 2021; 2025; 2027

Croatia competed at the 2025 Summer World University Games in Rhine-Ruhr, Germany held from 16 to 27 July 2025. Croatia was represented by 55 athletes and took forty-fifth place in the medal table with four medals. Leon Hrgota (taekwondo) and Tamara Artić (rhythmic gymnastics) were flag bearers at the opening ceremony.

== Medal summary ==
=== Medal by sports ===
Rank	Sports	Gold	Silver	Bronze	Total
1	Athletics	0	1	0	1
1	Rowing	0	1	0	1
3	Taekwondo	0	0	2	2
Totals (3 entries)		0	2	2	4

Source: rhineruhr2025.com

=== Medalists ===
Medal	Name	Sport	Event	Date
Silver	Veronika Drljačić	Athletics	Women's 400m	23 July
Silver	Goran Mahmutović; Karlo Borković	Rowing	Men's double sculls	27 July
Bronze	Ivana Arelić	Taekwondo	Women -62kg	21 July
Bronze	Vito Krpan	Taekwondo	Men -87kg	22 July
