= Swimming at the 2025 Summer World University Games – Women's 100 metre backstroke =

Women's 100 metre backstroke at the 2025 Summer World University Games
- Venue: Schwimm- und Sprunghalle im Europasportpark
- Location: Berlin
- Dates: 19 July (heats and semifinals); 20 July (final)
- Competitors: 39 from 27 nations

Medalists
gold medal	Kennedy Noble	United States
silver medal	Leah Shackley	United States
bronze medal	Lee Eun-ji	South Korea

The women's 100 metre backstroke at the 2025 Summer World University Games in Rhine-Ruhr, Germany was held from 19 to 20 July 2025. Kennedy Noble from the United States won the gold medal, Leah Shackley from the United States took the silver medal and Lee Eun-ji from South Korea earned the bronze medal.

== Schedule ==
All times are Central European Time (UTC+1)

Date	Time	Round
19 July	09:22	Heats
19 July	19:14	Semifinals
20 July	19:09	Final

== Records ==
Prior to the competition, the world and Universiade records were as follows.

Category	Swimmer	Record	Date	Place	Event
World record	(United States) Regan Smith	57.13	18 June 2024	Indianapolis, United States	2024 United States Olympic trials
Universiade record	(United States) Katharine Berkoff	59.29	7 July 2019	Naples, Italy	2019 Summer Universiade

== Results ==
=== Heats ===
All entered athletes competed across multiple seeded heats in the morning session. Swimmers with the top 16 fastest times advanced, regardless of which individual heat they swam.

Rank	Heat	Lane	Swimmer	Nation	Time	Notes
1	5	4	Leah Shackley	United States	59.74	Q
2	4	4	Kennedy Noble	United States	1:00.23	Q
3	3	5	Lee Eun-ji	South Korea	1:01.14	Q
4	5	7	Michaela de Villiers	South Africa	1:01.15	Q
5	5	6	Camila Rebelo	Portugal	1:01.50	Q
6	4	2	Gerda Szilágyi	Hungary	1:01.59	Q
6	5	3	Aimi Nagaoka	Japan	1:01.59	Q
8	4	5	Federica Toma	Italy	1:01.63	Q
9	5	2	Nika Sharafutdinova	Ukraine	1:01.64	Q
10	4	6	Kyoka Sawa	Japan	1:01.65	Q
11	4	8	Cindy Cheung	Hong Kong	1:01.76	Q
12	4	3	Ashley McMillan	Canada	1:01.78	Q
13	3	3	Francesca Pasquino	Italy	1:01.80	Q
14	5	5	Delia Lloyd	Canada	1:02.03	Q
15	3	1	Natalia Janiszewska	Poland	1:02.04	Q
16	3	7	Lou-Anne Guiton	France	1:02.06	Q
17	3	4	Adela Piskorska	Poland	1:02.08	
18	4	7	Sudem Denizli	Turkey	1:02.28	
19	3	6	Charlotte Cullen	Ireland	1:02.37	
20	4	1	Kim Ye-eun	South Korea	1:02.55	
21	5	1	Hannah Pearse	South Africa	1:02.58	
22	3	2	Rafaela Azevedo	Portugal	1:03.23	
23	2	5	Liao Yu-fei	Chinese Taipei	1:03.77	
24	3	8	Poppy Stephen	Australia	1:04.14	
25	2	4	María Contreras	Ecuador	1:04.53	
26	2	6	Wang Wan-chen	Chinese Taipei	1:04.68	
27	5	8	Gaia Rasmussen	Switzerland	1:05.72	
28	2	7	Pratyasa Ray	India	1:06.35	
29	2	2	Bára Matošková	Czech Republic	1:06.69	
30	2	3	Trinidad Ardiles	Chile	1:07.06	
31	1	7	Laeticia Hamdoun	Lebanon	1:07.53	
32	2	1	Karolin Kotsar	Estonia	1:08.67	
33	2	8	Aixa Recchioni	Argentina	1:09.33	
34	1	4	Delfina Varela	Argentina	1:10.21	
35	1	1	Eliane Saade	Lebanon	1:10.69	
36	1	5	Cheong I Weng	Macau	1:14.05	
37	1	3	Desire Minchala	Ecuador	1:16.58	
38	1	2	Eesha Shafi	Pakistan	1:40.81	
39	1	6	Dorah Nankunda	Uganda	1:47.46	

=== Semifinals ===
The 16 advancing swimmers were split into two semifinal heats of 8 during the evening session. The swimmers recording the top 8 fastest times advanced to the final round.

Rank	Heat	Lane	Swimmer	Nation	Time	Notes
1	2	4	Leah Shackley	United States	58.97	Q
2	1	4	Kennedy Noble	United States	59.19	Q
3	2	3	Camila Rebelo	Portugal	1:00.72	Q
4	2	5	Lee Eun-ji	South Korea	1:00.73	Q
5	1	5	Michaela de Villiers	South Africa	1:00.81	Q
6	1	6	Federica Toma	Italy	1:00.87	Q
7	1	7	Ashley McMillan	Canada	1:00.89	Q
8	1	3	Aimi Nagaoka	Japan	1:01.08	Q
9	1	2	Kyoka Sawa	Japan	1:01.46	
10	2	1	Francesca Pasquino	Italy	1:01.53	
11	1	8	Lou-Anne Guiton	France	1:01.83	
12	1	1	Delia Lloyd	Canada	1:01.90	
13	2	6	Gerda Szilágyi	Hungary	1:01.91	
14	2	2	Nika Sharafutdinova	Ukraine	1:01.92	
15	2	7	Cindy Cheung	Hong Kong	1:02.01	
16	2	8	Natalia Janiszewska	Poland	1:02.34	

=== Final ===
The fastest 8 swimmers competed in a single race to determine the gold, silver and bronze medalists.

Rank	Lane	Swimmer	Nation	Time	Notes
1st place, gold medalist(s)	5	Kennedy Noble	United States	58.78	FR
2nd place, silver medalist(s)	4	Leah Shackley	United States	59.13	
3rd place, bronze medalist(s)	6	Lee Eun-ji	South Korea	1:00.23	
4	3	Camila Rebelo	Portugal	1:00.34	
5	1	Ashley McMillan	Canada	1:00.81	
6	7	Federica Toma	Italy	1:00.88	
7	2	Michaela de Villiers	South Africa	1:01.03	
8	8	Aimi Nagaoka	Japan	1:01.52	
