= Swimming at the 2025 Summer World University Games – Women's 50 metre backstroke =

Women's 50 metre backstroke at the 2025 Summer World University Games
- Venue: Schwimm- und Sprunghalle im Europasportpark
- Location: Berlin
- Dates: 21 July (heats and semifinals); 22 July (final)
- Competitors: 33 from 23 nations

Medalists
gold medal	Leah Shackley	United States
silver medal	Kennedy Noble	United States
bronze medal	Olivia Nel	South Africa

The women's 50 metre backstroke at the 2025 Summer World University Games in Rhine-Ruhr, Germany was held from 21 to 22 July 2025. Leah Shackley from the United States won the gold medal, Kennedy Noble from the United States took the silver medal and Olivia Nel from South Africa earned the bronze medal.

== Schedule ==
All times are Central European Time (UTC+1)

Date	Time	Round
21 July	10:03	Heats
21 July	19:44	Semifinals
22 July	19:29	Final

== Records ==
Prior to the competition, the world and Universiade records were as follows.

Category	Swimmer	Record	Date	Place	Event
World record	(Australia) Kaylee McKeown	26.86	20 October 2023	Budapest, Hungary	2023 World Cup
Universiade record	(Poland) Adela Piskorska	27.84	6 August 2023	Chengdu, China	2021 Summer World University Games

== Results ==
=== Heats ===
All entered athletes competed across multiple seeded heats in the morning session. Swimmers with the top 16 fastest times advanced, regardless of which individual heat they swam.

Rank	Heat	Lane	Swimmer	Nation	Time	Notes
1	5	4	Leah Shackley	United States	28.03	Q
2	5	3	Olivia Nel	South Africa	28.19	Q
3	4	4	Kennedy Noble	United States	28.20	Q
4	5	5	Michaela de Villiers	South Africa	28.30	Q
5	3	4	Adela Piskorska	Poland	28.32	Q
6	3	5	Francesca Pasquino	Italy	28.54	Q
7	4	3	Federica Toma	Italy	28.62	Q
8	4	6	Lee Eun-ji	South Korea	28.68	Q
9	3	7	Kim Ye-eun	South Korea	28.80	Q
10	5	6	Nika Sharafutdinova	Ukraine	28.83	Q
11	3	3	Rafaela Azevedo	Portugal	28.90	Q
12	3	2	Aimi Nagaoka	Japan	29.17	Q
13	4	2	Liao Yu-fei	Chinese Taipei	29.22	Q
14	4	7	Britta Koehorst	Netherlands	29.36	Q
15	3	6	Gabriela Król	Poland	29.37	Q
16	5	2	Charlotte Cullen	Ireland	29.38	Q
17	5	7	Cindy Cheung	Hong Kong	29.40	
18	3	1	Lou-Anne Guiton	France	29.69	
19	5	8	Poppy Stephen	Australia	30.01	
20	4	8	María Contreras	Ecuador	30.17	
21	3	8	Trinidad Ardiles	Chile	30.90	
22	1	4	Aixa Recchioni	Argentina	30.98	
23	2	3	Pratyasa Ray	India	31.34	
24	1	5	Varsenik Manucharyan	Armenia	31.64	
25	2	8	Laeticia Hamdoun	Lebanon	31.67	
25	2	2	Kuok Hei Cheng	Macau	31.67	
27	2	4	Antonia Cubillos	Chile	32.10	
28	1	3	Eliane Saade	Lebanon	32.49	
29	2	5	Delfina Varela	Argentina	32.94	
30	2	6	Cheong I Weng	Macau	33.39	
31	2	7	Vanessa Balbuca	Ecuador	36.88	
32	2	1	Eesha Shafi	Pakistan	46.20	
33	1	6	Dorah Nankunda	Uganda	50.58	

=== Semifinals ===
The 16 advancing swimmers were split into two semifinal heats of 8 during the evening session. The swimmers recording the top 8 fastest times advanced to the final round.

Rank	Heat	Lane	Swimmer	Nation	Time	Notes
1	2	4	Leah Shackley	United States	27.66	Q
2	2	5	Kennedy Noble	United States	27.81	Q
3	1	4	Olivia Nel	South Africa	27.96	Q
4	1	5	Michaela de Villiers	South Africa	28.00	Q
5	2	3	Adela Piskorska	Poland	28.14	Q
6	2	6	Federica Toma	Italy	28.35	Q
7	1	6	Lee Eun-ji	South Korea	28.56	Q
8	1	3	Francesca Pasquino	Italy	28.69	Q
9	1	2	Nika Sharafutdinova	Ukraine	28.79	
10	2	7	Rafaela Azevedo	Portugal	28.81	
11	2	2	Kim Ye-eun	South Korea	28.85	
12	1	7	Aimi Nagaoka	Japan	29.04	
13	1	8	Charlotte Cullen	Ireland	29.28	
14	2	8	Gabriela Król	Poland	29.29	
15	1	1	Britta Koehorst	Netherlands	29.34	
16	2	1	Liao Yu-fei	Chinese Taipei	29.42	

=== Final ===
The fastest 8 swimmers competed in a single race to determine the gold, silver and bronze medalists.

Rank	Lane	Swimmer	Nation	Time	Notes
1st place, gold medalist(s)	4	Leah Shackley	United States	27.31	FR
2nd place, silver medalist(s)	5	Kennedy Noble	United States	27.67	
3rd place, bronze medalist(s)	3	Olivia Nel	South Africa	27.91	
4	2	Adela Piskorska	Poland	28.31	
5	6	Michaela de Villiers	South Africa	28.37	
6	7	Federica Toma	Italy	28.45	
7	1	Lee Eun-ji	South Korea	28.66	
8	8	Francesca Pasquino	Italy	28.70	
