= Athletics at the 2025 Summer World University Games – Women's 400 metres hurdles =

Women's 400 metres hurdles at the 2025 Summer World University Games
- Venue: Lohrheidestadion
- Location: Bochum, Germany
- Dates: 22 July (heats); 23 July (semi-finals); 24 July (final)
- Competitors: 35 from 28 nations
- Winning time: 54.60 PB

Medalists
gold medal	Alice Muraro	Italy
silver medal	Michelle Smith	Virgin Islands
bronze medal	Sára Mátó	Hungary

The women's 400 metres hurdles event at the 2025 Summer World University Games was held in Bochum, Germany, at Lohrheidestadion on 22, 23 and 24 July.

== Records ==
Prior to the competition, the records were as follows:

Record	Athlete (nation)	Time (s)	Location	Date
Games record	Daimí Pernía (CUB)	53.95	Palma de Mallorca, Spain	10 July 1999

== Results ==
=== Heats ===
First 4 in each heat (Q) and the next 4 fastest (q) qualified for the semi-finals.

==== Heat 1 ====
Place	Athlete	Nation	Time	Notes
1	Alice Muraro	Italy	56.26	Q
2	Alesha Bennetts	Australia	56.49	Q, PB
3	Hannah van Niekerk	South Africa	56.62	Q
4	Sabrina Heil	Germany	57.19	Q
5	Rebecca Slezáková	Slovakia	58.28	
6	Shelby MacIsaac	Canada	1:00.22	PB
7	Arisa Weruwanarak	Thailand	1:00.89	

==== Heat 2 ====
Place	Athlete	Nation	Time	Notes
1	Ilana Hanssens	Belgium	56.50	Q, PB
2	Sára Mátó	Hungary	57.15	Q
3	Paulina Kubis	Poland	57.25	Q
4	Juliana Guerreiro	Portugal	57.90	Q
5	Maša Garić	Bosnia and Herzegovina	59.26	q
6	Jania Hodges	United States	59.40	q
7	Orla Brennan	Great Britain	59.95	
8	Maria Biskopstö	Denmark	1:02.03	PB

==== Heat 3 ====
Place	Athlete	Nation	Time	Notes
1	Lena Wernli	Switzerland	56.60	Q
2	Antonia Sanchez	Mexico	56.85	Q
3	Natalija Švenda	Croatia	56.92	Q, PB
4	Miku Takino	Japan	57.21	Q
5	Anja Dlauhy	Austria	57.53	q, PB
6	Deekshitha Ramakrishna	India	59.76	PB
7	Magatte Ndiaye	Senegal	1:02.79	TR 17.2.3

==== Heat 4 ====
Place	Athlete	Nation	Time	Notes
1	Salome Hüsler	Switzerland	57.73	Q
2	Carla García	Spain	57.94	Q
3	Zuzana Cymbálová	Czech Republic	58.17	Q
4	Regina Mohai	Hungary	58.98	Q
5	Mandy Goh Li	Malaysia	1:03.12	
6	Emmija Ivule	Latvia	1:04.51	

==== Heat 5 ====
Place	Athlete	Nation	Time	Notes
1	Yasmin Amaadacho	Germany	56.96	Q
2	Michelle Smith	Virgin Islands	56.99	Q
3	Heidi Salminen	Finland	57.07	Q, SB
4	Magdalena Šlapáková	Czech Republic	57.12	Q
5	Isabella Guthrie	Australia	59.62	
6	Stephanie Brooks	Great Britain	1:02.46	
7	S. K. Shreevarthani	India	DQ	

=== Semi-finals ===
First 2 in each heat (Q) and the next 2 fastest (q) qualified for the final.

==== Heat 1 ====
Place	Athlete	Nation	Time	Notes
1	Lena Wernli	Switzerland	56.09	Q
2	Sára Mátó	Hungary	56.20	Q
3	Yasmin Amaadacho	Germany	56.60	q
4	Carla García	Spain	56.77	PB
5	Miku Takino	Japan	57.58	
6	Zuzana Cymbálová	Czech Republic	57.74	
7	Rebecca Slezáková	Slovakia	57.81	
8	Anja Dlauhy	Austria	57.99	

==== Heat 2 ====
Place	Athlete	Nation	Time	Notes
1	Hannah van Niekerk	South Africa	56.16	Q, PB
2	Michelle Smith	Virgin Islands	56.37	Q
3	Ilana Hanssens	Belgium	56.57	q
4	Paulina Kubis	Poland	56.88	
5	Regina Mohai	Hungary	56.98	PB
6	Salome Hüsler	Switzerland	58.00	
7	Sabrina Heil	Germany	58.02	
8	Maša Garić	Bosnia and Herzegovina	59.55	

==== Heat 3 ====
Place	Athlete	Nation	Time	Notes
1	Alice Muraro	Italy	56.73	
2	Alesha Bennetts	Australia	57.04	
3	Natalija Švenda	Croatia	57.13	
4	Antonia Sanchez	Mexico	57.21	
5	Heidi Salminen	Finland	57.61	
6	Juliana Guerreiro	Portugal	57.89	
7	Magdalena Šlapáková	Czech Republic	58.76	
8	Jania Hodges	United States	1:00.25	

=== Final ===
Place	Athlete	Nation	Time	Notes
1st place, gold medalist(s)	Alice Muraro	Italy	54.60	PB
2nd place, silver medalist(s)	Michelle Smith	Virgin Islands	55.65	
3rd place, bronze medalist(s)	Sára Mátó	Hungary	55.92	
4	Yasmin Amaadacho	Germany	56.05	PB
5	Alesha Bennetts	Australia	56.71	
6	Ilana Hanssens	Belgium	56.95	
7	Hannah van Niekerk	South Africa	58.02	
—	Lena Wernli	Switzerland	DNF	
