= Swimming at the 2025 Summer World University Games – Women's 200 metre backstroke =

Women's 200 metre backstroke at the 2025 Summer World University Games
- Venue: Schwimm- und Sprunghalle im Europasportpark
- Location: Berlin
- Dates: 17 July (heats and semifinals); 18 July (final)
- Competitors: 28 from 20 nations

Medalists
gold medal	Leah Shackley	United States
silver medal	Kennedy Noble	United States
bronze medal	Lee Eun-ji	South Korea

The women's 200 metre backstroke at the 2025 Summer World University Games in Rhine-Ruhr, Germany was held from 17 to 18 July 2025. Leah Shackley from the United States won the gold medal, Kennedy Noble from the United States took the silver medal and Lee Eun-ji from South Korea earned the bronze medal.

== Schedule ==
All times are Central European Time (UTC+1)

Date	Time	Round
17 July	10:06	Heats
17 July	19:26	Semifinals
18 July	20:21	Final

== Records ==
Prior to the competition, the world and Universiade records were as follows.

Category	Swimmer	Record	Date	Place	Event
World record	(Australia) Kaylee McKeown	2:03.14	10 March 2023	Sydney, Australia	2023 NSW Open Championships
Universiade record	(United States) Lisa Bratton	2:07.91	5 July 2019	Naples, Italy	2019 Summer Universiade

== Results ==
=== Heats ===
All entered athletes competed across multiple seeded heats in the morning session. Swimmers with the top 16 fastest times advanced, regardless of which individual heat they swam.

Rank	Heat	Lane	Swimmer	Nation	Time	Notes
1	4	4	Leah Shackley	United States	2:09.64	Q
2	4	5	Lee Eun-ji	South Korea	2:10.51	Q
3	3	4	Kennedy Noble	United States	2:11.09	Q
4	2	4	Camila Rebelo	Portugal	2:11.42	Q
5	3	6	Kyoka Sawa	Japan	2:11.49	Q
6	3	7	Lee Yun-jung	South Korea	2:11.72	Q
7	3	2	Hannah Pearse	South Africa	2:11.80	Q
8	4	6	Adela Piskorska	Poland	2:11.92	Q
9	2	5	Delia Lloyd	Canada	2:11.94	Q
10	3	1	Han An-chi	Chinese Taipei	2:11.96	Q
11	4	3	Gerda Szilágyi	Hungary	2:12.65	Q
12	2	6	Cindy Cheung	Hong Kong	2:12.69	Q
13	3	5	Lou-Anne Guiton	France	2:12.71	Q
14	3	3	Nanami Ito	Japan	2:12.72	Q
15	4	2	Francesca Pasquino	Italy	2:14.80	Q
16	2	3	Francesca Furfaro	Italy	2:14.84	Q
17	2	7	Sudem Denizli	Turkey	2:15.76	
18	4	7	Gaia Rasmussen	Switzerland	2:16.03	
19	2	2	Nika Sharafutdinova	Ukraine	2:17.12	
20	4	1	Charlotte Cullen	Ireland	2:17.28	
21	2	1	Natalia Janiszewska	Poland	2:17.41	
22	4	8	Zeynep Selin Şahin	Turkey	2:17.49	
23	2	8	Josefina Allport	Argentina	2:21.10	
24	1	4	Trinidad Ardiles	Chile	2:24.05	
25	1	5	Pratyasa Ray	India	2:24.55	
26	3	8	María Contreras	Ecuador	2:25.61	
27	1	3	Shrungi Bandekar	India	2:31.24	
28	1	6	Delfina Varela	Argentina	2:38.84	

=== Semifinals ===
The 16 advancing swimmers were split into two semifinal heats of 8 during the evening session. The swimmers recording the top 8 fastest times advanced to the final round.

Rank	Heat	Lane	Swimmer	Nation	Time	Notes
1	2	4	Leah Shackley	United States	2:06.93	Q
2	2	5	Kennedy Noble	United States	2:06.97	Q
3	1	5	Camila Rebelo	Portugal	2:09.50	Q
4	2	2	Delia Lloyd	Canada	2:10.10	Q
5	1	4	Lee Eun-ji	South Korea	2:10.29	Q
6	2	6	Hannah Pearse	South Africa	2:10.45	Q
7	1	6	Adela Piskorska	Poland	2:10.85	Q
8	1	7	Cindy Cheung	Hong Kong	2:11.08	Q
9	2	3	Kyoka Sawa	Japan	2:11.32	
10	1	1	Nanami Ito	Japan	2:11.37	
11	2	7	Gerda Szilágyi	Hungary	2:11.87	
12	2	1	Lou-Anne Guiton	France	2:11.94	
13	1	3	Lee Yun-jung	South Korea	2:12.22	
14	1	2	Han An-chi	Chinese Taipei	2:12.47	
15	1	8	Francesca Furfaro	Italy	2:14.72	
16	2	8	Francesca Pasquino	Italy	2:14.99	

=== Final ===
The fastest 8 swimmers competed in a single race to determine the gold, silver and bronze medalists.

Rank	Lane	Swimmer	Nation	Time	Notes
1st place, gold medalist(s)	4	Leah Shackley	United States	2:05.99	FR
2nd place, silver medalist(s)	5	Kennedy Noble	United States	2:07.82	
3rd place, bronze medalist(s)	2	Lee Eun-ji	South Korea	2:08.29	
4	3	Camila Rebelo	Portugal	2:08.96	
5	1	Adela Piskorska	Poland	2:10.19	
6	7	Hannah Pearse	South Africa	2:10.39	
7	6	Delia Lloyd	Canada	2:12.45	
8	8	Cindy Cheung	Hong Kong	2:12.66	
