= Swimming at the 2025 Summer World University Games – Women's 4 × 100 metre medley relay =

Women's 4 × 100 metre medley relay at the 2025 Summer World University Games
- Venue: Schwimm- und Sprunghalle im Europasportpark
- Location: Berlin
- Dates: 23 July (heats and final)
- Nations: 16

Medalists
gold medal	Kennedy Noble; Emma Weber; Leah Shackley; Maxine Parker; Leah Hayes; Isabel Ivey; Teagan O'Dell; Ella Welch	United States
silver medal	Adela Piskorska; Barbara Mazurkiewicz; Wiktoria Piotrowska; Julia Maik; Natalia Janiszewska; Gabriela Król; Aleksandra Polańska	Poland
bronze medal	Federica Toma; Francesca Zucca; Viola Scotto di Carlo; Agata Ambler; Giulia Caprai; Giulia D'Innocenzo; Chiara Della Corte; Francesca Pasquino	Italy

The women's 4 × 100 metre medley relay at the 2025 Summer World University Games in Rhine-Ruhr, Germany was held 23 July 2025. United States won the gold medal, Poland took the silver medal and Italy earned the bronze medal.

== Schedule ==
All times are Central European Time (UTC+1)

Date	Time	Round
23 July	09:57	Heats
23 July	20:37	Final

== Records ==
Prior to the competition, the world and Universiade records were as follows.

Category	Team	Record	Date	Place	Event
World record	United States	3:49.63	4 August 2024	Paris, France	2024 Summer Olympics
Universiade record	Russia	3:58.04	16 July 2013	Kazan, Russia	2013 Summer Universiade

== Results ==
=== Heats ===
All entered teams competed across multiple seeded heats in the morning session. Teams with the top 8 fastest times advanced, regardless of which individual heat they swam.

Rank	Heat	Lane	Nation	Swimmers	Time	Notes
1	2	4	United States	Teagan O'Dell (1:00.63); Leah Hayes (2:09.65); Ella Welch (3:08.62); Isabel Ivey (4:03.00)	4:03.00	Q
2	1	3	Italy	Francesca Pasquino (1:01.65); Chiara Della Corte (2:10.53); Giulia Caprai (3:09.83); Giulia D'Innocenzo (4:06.22)	4:06.22	Q
3	2	2	South Africa	Michaela de Villiers (1:01.82); Lara van Niekerk (2:10.21); Leigh McMorran (3:12.96); Olivia Nel (4:07.11)	4:07.11	Q
4	1	4	Japan	Aimi Nagaoka (1:02.00); Rio Sato (2:12.73); Uran Noda (3:12.11); Ayu Mizoguchi (4:08.29)	4:08.29	Q
5	1	5	Poland	Natalia Janiszewska (1:02.58); Barbara Mazurkiewicz (2:11.43); Gabriela Król (3:12.45); Aleksandra Polańska (4:08.34)	4:08.34	Q
6	2	6	Hungary	Gerda Szilágyi (1:02.08); Sára Bozsó (2:11.70); Beatrix Tankó (3:11.06); Nóra Flück (4:09.10)	4:09.10	Q
7	1	6	Australia	Poppy Stephen (1:05.52); Kyla Brown (2:17.25); Josephine Crimmins (3:15.76); Hannah Allen (4:12.02)	4:12.02	Q
8	2	7	Chinese Taipei	Liao Yu-fei (1:04.03); Hung Chieh-yu (2:16.09); Liu Pei-yin (3:17.04); Han An-chi (4:13.30)	4:13.30	Q
9	2	3	Canada	Delia Lloyd (1:02.42); Ashley McMillan (2:12.90); Julia Strojnowska (3:17.14); Emma O'Croinin (4:13.92)	4:13.92	
10	1	2	Turkey	Sudem Denizli (1:03.20); Hazal Özkan (2:14.20); Deniz Ertan (3:16.81); Zeynep Şahin (4:16.07)	4:16.07	
11	1	7	Slovakia	Laura Benková (1:05.59); Nina Vadovičová (2:17.81); Zora Ripková (3:19.07); Sabína Kupčová (4:17.22)	4:17.22	
12	2	5	South Korea	Kim Ye-eun (1:02.09); Yun Eun-sol (2:15.04); Yang Ha-jung (3:16.99); Hong Jung-hwa (4:18.96)	4:18.96	
13	1	1	Singapore	Ashley Lim (1:08.77); Elle Tay (2:20.43); Yeo Chiok Sze (3:20.87); Chan Zi Yi (4:19.76)	4:19.76	
14	2	1	Argentina	Josefina Allport (1:07.07); Martina Barbeito (2:20.94); Belen Lahoz (3:26.73); Mia Martinicorena (4:31.75)	4:31.75	
15	2	8	India	Pratyasa Ray (1:06.96); Naga Vasupalli (2:25.69); Nilabjaa Ghosh (3:32.61); Nina Venkatesh (4:35.31)	4:35.31	
16	1	8	Ecuador	María Contreras (1:05.53); Karen Barros (2:28.62); Kimberly Uyaguari (3:35.09); Ana Matute (4:39.59)	4:39.59	

=== Final ===
The fastest 8 teams competed in a single race to determine the gold, silver and bronze medalists.

Rank	Lane	Nation	Swimmers	Time	Notes
1st place, gold medalist(s)	4	United States	Kennedy Noble (1:01.05); Emma Weber (2:08.52); Leah Shackley (3:06.10); Maxine Parker (3:59.68)	3:59.68	
2nd place, silver medalist(s)	2	Poland	Adela Piskorska (1:00.50); Barbara Mazurkiewicz (2:07.39); Wiktoria Piotrowska (3:06.05); Julia Maik (4:01.33)	4:01.33	
3rd place, bronze medalist(s)	5	Italy	Federica Toma (1:00.97); Francesca Zucca (2:08.88); Viola Scotto di Carlo (3:06.42); Agata Ambler (4:01.45)	4:01.45	
4	7	Hungary	Gerda Szilágyi (1:02.41); Aliz Kalmár (2:10.03); Laura Ilyés (3:10.51); Beatrix Tankó (4:05.80)	4:05.80	
5	3	South Africa	Michaelade Villiers (1:01.50); Simone Moll (2:10.24); Leigh McMorran (3:11.95); Olivia Nel (4:06.45)	4:06.45	
6	1	Australia	Poppy Stephen (1:03.76); Kyla Brown (2:14.00); Josephine Crimmins (3:12.00); Hannah Allen (4:08.42)	4:08.42	
7	8	Chinese Taipei	Liao Yu-fei (1:04.54); Hung Chieh-yu (2:17.41); Liu Pei-yin (3:18.08); Han An-chi (4:13.87)	4:13.87	
–	6	Japan	Aimi Nagaoka (1:01.67); Yuyumi Obatake (2:10.66); Uran Noda; Rio Suzuki	DSQ	
