= Swimming at the 2025 Summer World University Games – Men's 200 metre backstroke =

Men's 200 metre backstroke at the 2025 Summer World University Games
- Venue: Schwimm- und Sprunghalle im Europasportpark
- Location: Berlin
- Dates: 22 July (heats and semifinals); 23 July (final)
- Competitors: 33 from 25 nations

Medalists
gold medal	Daniel Diehl	United States
silver medal	David King	United States
bronze medal	Mathys Chouchaoui	France

The men's 200 metre backstroke at the 2025 Summer World University Games in Rhine-Ruhr, Germany was held from 22 to 23 July 2025. Daniel Diehl from the United States won the gold medal, David King from the United States took the silver medal and Mathys Chouchaoui from France earned the bronze medal.

== Schedule ==
All times are Central European Time (UTC+1)

Date	Time	Round
22 July	09:00	Heats
22 July	19:49	Semifinals
23 July	19:00	Final

== Records ==
Prior to the competition, the world and Universiade records were as follows.

Category	Swimmer	Record	Date	Place	Event
World record	(United States) Aaron Peirsol	1:51.92	31 July 2009	Rome, Italy	2009 World Championships
Universiade record	(Japan) Ryosuke Irie	1:54.13	10 July 2009	Belgrade, Serbia	2009 Summer Universiade

== Results ==
=== Heats ===
All entered athletes competed across multiple seeded heats in the morning session. Swimmers with the top 16 fastest times advanced, regardless of which individual heat they swam.

Rank	Heat	Lane	Swimmer	Nation	Time	Notes
1	4	4	David King	United States	1:58.53	Q
2	3	4	Aleksei Tkachev	Individual Neutral Athletes	1:58.90	Q
3	5	4	Daniel Diehl	United States	1:58.92	Q
4	5	3	Mathys Chouchaoui	France	1:59.50	Q
5	5	7	Primož Senica	Slovenia	1:59.65	Q
6	5	1	Benjamin Loewen	Canada	1:59.82	Q
7	4	2	Ricardo Santos	Portugal	1:59.93	Q
8	4	6	Stuart Swinburn	Australia	2:00.02	Q
9	3	6	Alexandru Constantinescu	Romania	2:00.33	Q
10	3	3	Diego Mira	Spain	2:00.42	Q
10	4	3	Alexandre Desangles	France	2:00.42	Q
12	5	5	Yusuke Sato	Japan	2:00.64	Q
13	5	2	Filip Kosiński	Poland	2:00.82	Q
14	3	5	Pietro Ubertalli	Italy	2:00.94	Q
15	5	6	Nicolás Garcia	Spain	2:01.00	Q
16	3	7	Kim Seong-ju	South Korea	2:01.17	Q
17	4	1	Hayden Kwan	Hong Kong	2:01.18	
18	4	7	Filip Suchański	Poland	2:01.77	
19	3	2	Vadym Naumenko	Ukraine	2:02.39	
20	4	5	Cornelius Jahn	Germany	2:02.55	
21	3	1	Dylan Wright	South Africa	2:02.93	
22	3	8	Khiew Hoe Yean	Malaysia	2:03.20	
23	4	8	Erikas Grigaitis	Lithuania	2:03.21	
24	5	8	Kajus Stankevičius	Lithuania	2:03.24	
25	2	1	Nithik Nathella	India	2:05.34	
26	2	4	Ahmad Safie	Lebanon	2:06.15	
27	2	3	Jaka Pušnik	Slovenia	2:06.44	
28	2	2	Steven Jaramillo	Ecuador	2:07.25	
29	1	4	Martín Álvarez	Ecuador	2:11.63	
30	1	5	Patricio Bobadilla	Chile	2:11.89	
31	2	7	Germans Čiļeks	Latvia	2:16.10	
32	1	3	Tselmeg Khash-Erdene	Mongolia	2:19.29	
—	2	5	Oskar Schildknecht	Germany	DNS	

=== Semifinals ===
The 16 advancing swimmers were split into two semifinal heats of 8 during the evening session. The swimmers recording the top 8 fastest times advanced to the final round.

Rank	Heat	Lane	Swimmer	Nation	Time	Notes
1	2	4	David King	United States	1:57.54	Q
2	1	5	Mathys Chouchaoui	France	1:57.72	Q
3	1	4	Aleksei Tkachev	Individual Neutral Athletes	1:58.00	Q
4	2	5	Daniel Diehl	United States	1:58.17	Q
5	1	3	Benjamin Loewen	Canada	1:58.78	Q
6	1	6	Stuart Swinburn	Australia	1:59.08	Q
7	1	1	Pietro Ubertalli	Italy	1:59.25	Q
8	2	6	Ricardo Santos	Portugal	1:59.30	Q
9	2	3	Primoz Senica	Slovenia	1:59.38	
10	1	2	Diego Mira	Spain	1:59.49	
11	2	7	Alexandre Desangles	France	1:59.88	
12	1	7	Yusuke Sato	Japan	2:00.41	
13	2	2	Alexandru Constantinescu	Romania	2:00.99	
14	1	8	Kim Seong-ju	South Korea	2:01.45	
15	2	8	Nicolás Garcia	Spain	2:02.46	
—	2	1	Filip Kosiński	Poland	DSQ	

=== Final ===
The fastest 8 swimmers competed in a single race to determine the gold, silver and bronze medalists.

Rank	Lane	Swimmer	Nation	Time	Notes
1st place, gold medalist(s)	6	Daniel Diehl	United States	1:55.91	
2nd place, silver medalist(s)	4	David King	United States	1:56.00	
3rd place, bronze medalist(s)	5	Mathys Chouchaoui	France	1:58.08	
4	3	Aleksei Tkachev	Individual Neutral Athletes	1:58.45	
5	7	Stuart Swinburn	Australia	1:58.66	
6	2	Benjamin Loewen	Canada	1:59.00	
7	8	Ricardo Santos	Portugal	1:59.25	
8	1	Pietro Ubertalli	Italy	1:59.58	
