= Athletics at the 2025 Summer World University Games – Men's 400 metres hurdles =

Men's 400 metres hurdles at the 2025 Summer World University Games
- Venue: Lohrheidestadion
- Location: Bochum, Germany
- Dates: 21 July (heats); 22 July (semi-finals); 23 July (final)
- Competitors: 28 from 25 nations
- Winning time: 49.29

Medalists
| gold medal | Berke Akçam | Turkey |
| silver medal | Ryan Matulonis | United States |
| bronze medal | Patrik Dömötör | Slovakia |

The men's 400 metres hurdles event at the 2025 Summer World University Games was held in Bochum, Germany, at Lohrheidestadion on 21, 22 and 23 July.

== Records ==
Prior to the competition, the records were as follows:

| Record | Athlete (nation) | Time (s) | Location | Date |
|---|---|---|---|---|
| Games record | Alwyn Myburgh (RSA) | 48.09 | Beijing, China | 31 August 2001 |

== Results ==
=== Heats ===
First 3 in each heat (Q) and the next 4 fastest (q) qualified for the semi-finals.

==== Heat 1 ====
| Place | Athlete | Nation | Time | Notes |
|---|---|---|---|---|
| 1 | Ryan Matulonis | United States | 50.51 | Q |
| 2 | Berke Akçam | Turkey | 50.55 | Q |
| 3 | Mori Ruchit | India | 50.58 | Q, PB |
| 4 | Chen Jian-rong | Chinese Taipei | 50.69 | q |
| 5 | Ben Tilson | Canada | 50.86 | q, PB |
| 6 | Gustav Karlsson | Sweden | 53.26 | |

==== Heat 2 ====
| Place | Athlete | Nation | Time | Notes |
|---|---|---|---|---|
| 1 | Ryosuke Takahashi | Japan | 50.20 | Q |
| 2 | Marc Anthony Ibrahim | Lebanon | 50.27 | Q |
| 3 | Duarte Fernandes | Portugal | 50.38 | Q, PB |
| 4 | Andreas Haara Bakketun | Norway | 50.50 | q |
| 5 | David Moulongou | Canada | 52.24 | PB |
| 6 | Byron Preciado | Ecuador | 53.11 | PB |
| 7 | Jordan Pace | Malta | 55.43 | |
| 8 | Muhammad Fakrul | Malaysia | 1:11.87 | |

==== Heat 3 ====
| Place | Athlete | Nation | Time | Notes |
|---|---|---|---|---|
| 1 | Lin Chung-wei | Chinese Taipei | 50.43 | Q |
| 2 | Niklas Strohmayer-Dangl | Austria | 50.91 | Q |
| 3 | Wernich van Rensburg | South Africa | 51.35 | Q |
| 4 | Azzam Ibrahim Abu Bakr | Saudi Arabia | 53.41 | |
| 5 | Jose Manuel Higuera | Mexico | 53.82 | |
| 6 | Chi Chong Cheong | Macau | 54.24 | |
| 7 | Andres Ruiz | Colombia | 56.00 | |

==== Heat 4 ====
| Place | Athlete | Nation | Time | Notes |
|---|---|---|---|---|
| 1 | Syota Fuchigami | Japan | 50.16 | Q |
| 2 | Patrik Dömötör | Slovakia | 50.55 | Q |
| 3 | Nahom Yirga | Switzerland | 50.73 | Q |
| 4 | Csaba Molnár | Hungary | 50.91 | q |
| 5 | An Seong Jung | South Korea | 52.31 | |
| 6 | Henri Ilves | Estonia | 53.89 | |
| 7 | Ova Thandalge | Switzerland | 57.90 | |

=== Semi-finals ===
First 3 in each heat (Q) and the next 2 fastest (q) qualified for the final.

==== Heat 1 ====
| Place | Athlete | Nation | Time | Notes |
|---|---|---|---|---|
| 1 | Berke Akçam | Turkey | 49.68 | Q |
| 2 | Patrik Dömötör | Slovakia | 49.69 | Q |
| 3 | Ryosuke Takahashi | Japan | 49.95 | Q |
| 4 | Lin Chung-wei | Chinese Taipei | 49.97 | |
| 5 | Nahom Yirga | Switzerland | 50.23 | SB |
| 6 | Csaba Molnár | Hungary | 50.92 | |
| 7 | Mori Ruchit | India | 51.04 | |
| 8 | Ben Tilson | Canada | 51.69 | |

==== Heat 2 ====
| Place | Athlete | Nation | Time | Notes |
|---|---|---|---|---|
| 1 | Duarte Fernandes | Portugal | 49.51 | Q, PB |
| 2 | Marc Anthony Ibrahim | Lebanon | 49.61 | Q |
| 3 | Ryan Matulonis | United States | 49.69 | Q |
| 4 | Niklas Strohmayer-Dangl | Austria | 49.74 | q, PB |
| 5 | Syota Fuchigami | Japan | 49.95 | q |
| 6 | Chen Jian-rong | Chinese Taipei | 50.65 | |
| 7 | Andreas Haara Bakketun | Norway | 51.33 | |
| — | Wernich van Rensburg | South Africa | DQ | TR 16.8 |

=== Final ===
| Place | Athlete | Nation | Time | Notes |
|---|---|---|---|---|
| 1st place, gold medalist(s) | Berke Akçam | Turkey | 49.29 | |
| 2nd place, silver medalist(s) | Ryan Matulonis | United States | 49.38 | PB |
| 3rd place, bronze medalist(s) | Patrik Dömötör | Slovakia | 49.45 | |
| 4 | Ryosuke Takahashi | Japan | 49.60 | |
| 5 | Marc Anthony Ibrahim | Lebanon | 50.05 | |
| 6 | Syota Fuchigami | Japan | 50.45 | |
| 7 | Duarte Fernandes | Portugal | 50.77 | |
| 8 | Niklas Strohmayer-Dangl | Austria | 51.96 | |
