= 3x3 basketball at the 2025 Summer World University Games – Men's tournament =

Men's 3x3 tournament at the 2025 Summer World University Games
- Venue: Jahrhunderthalle
- Location: Bochum
- Dates: 17—20 July 2025
- Nations: 16

Medalists
gold medal	Lithuania
silver medal	United States
bronze medal	Czech Republic

The men's 3x3 tournament in basketball at the 2025 Summer Universiade in Rhine-Ruhr, Germany was held from 17 to 20 July 2025. This was the first edition of 3x3 basketball at the Summer World University Games.

== Rosters ==
Seed	Team	Players			
1	United States	Avery Brown	Jackson Hicke	Chandler Pigge	Nicholas Townsend
2	France	Paul Billong	Rudy Ekwakwe	Jeffté Pasquier	Louis Gibey
3	Lithuania	Rokas Jocys	Augustinas Mikštas	Titas Januševičius	Gabrielius Čelka
4	Germany	Carlo Meyer	Lennart Schultz	Linus Beikame	Vincent Hennen
5	Mongolia	Baasandorj Munkhtur	Altangerel Batsaikhan	Avirmed Lhagvaa	Chinguun Uuganbayar
6	Poland	Piotr Lis	Michał Sitnik	Szymon Sobiech	Daniel Ziółkowski
7	Czech Republic	Matěj Rychtecký	Adam Růžička	Štěpán Borovka	Dominik Žák
8	Italy	Giacomo Bonavida	Lorenzo Donadio	Francesco De Capitani	Morgan Rashed
9	Chile	Lucas Márquez	Alfredo Waugh	Mauricio Serrano	Cristóbal Ordóñez
10	Egypt	Salah Elmonayery	Youssef Mahmoud	Bahaa Abdelmaged	Yousef Halal
11	South Africa	Khomanani Makamu	Silindokuhle Mkhwanazi	Allan Mametja	Matthew Williams
12	India	Avinash Borus	Kartik Murugan	Vishvak Ganesan	Mukesh Rajasekar

== Preliminary round ==
=== Group A ===
Pos	Team	Pld	W	L	PF	PA	PD	Qualification
1	United States	2	2	0	40	21	+19	Qualification for quarterfinals
2	Italy	2	1	1	33	31	+2	Qualification for play-in games
3	Chile	2	0	2	21	42	−21	Qualification for play-in games

Source: rhineruhr2025

17 July 2025
11:20

Boxscore

United States	21–9	Chile
Pts: Townsend 9		Pts: Serrano 8

Jahrhunderthalle, Bochum
Referees: Henning Fröhlich (GER), Marie-Pier Houlé (CAN)

17 July 2025
15:00

Boxscore

Italy	21–12	Chile
Pts: Rashed 12		Pts: Ordoñez 5

Jahrhunderthalle, Bochum
Referees: Andrada Csender (ROU), Li Caiyan (CHN)

17 July 2025
18:15

Boxscore

United States	19–12	Italy
Pts: Townsend 10		Pts: Bonavida 6

Jahrhunderthalle, Bochum
Referees: Rauno Peerandi (EST), Karim Soliman (EGY)

=== Group B ===
Pos	Team	Pld	W	L	PF	PA	PD	Qualification
1	France	2	2	0	42	28	+14	Qualification for quarterfinals
2	Czech Republic	2	1	1	40	35	+5	Qualification for play-in games
3	Egypt	2	0	2	23	42	−19	Qualification for play-in games

Source: rhineruhr2025

18 July 2025
11:20

Boxscore

France	21–9	Egypt
Pts: Ekwakwe 8		Pts: Abdelmaged 4

Jahrhunderthalle, Bochum
Referees: Henning Fröhlich (GER), Marie-Pier Houlé (CAN)

18 July 2025
15:00

Boxscore

Czech Republic	21–14	Egypt
Pts: Borovka, Žák 7		Pts: Abdelmaged 7

Jahrhunderthalle, Bochum
Referees: Andrada Csender (ROU), Rauno Peerandi (EST)

18 July 2025
20:00

Boxscore

France	21–19	Czech Republic
Pts: Ekwakwe 13		Pts: Růžička 10

Jahrhunderthalle, Bochum
Referees: Andrada Csender (ROU), Rauno Peerandi (EST)

=== Group C ===
Pos	Team	Pld	W	L	PF	PA	PD	Qualification
1	Lithuania	2	2	0	42	24	+18	Qualification for quarterfinals
2	Poland	2	1	1	32	32	0	Qualification for play-in games
3	South Africa	2	0	2	24	42	−18	Qualification for play-in games

Source: rhineruhr2025

17 July 2025
11:45

Boxscore

Lithuania	21–13	South Africa
Pts: Mikštas 8		Pts: Williams 5

Jahrhunderthalle, Bochum
Referees: Tojonirina Andriamanantso (MAD), Henning Fröhlich (GER)

17 July 2025
15:25

Boxscore

Poland	21–11	South Africa
Pts: Sitnik 8		Pts: Makamu 4

Jahrhunderthalle, Bochum
Referees: Li Caiyan (CHN), Rauno Peerandi (EST)

17 July 2025
18:40

Boxscore

Lithuania	21–11	Poland
Pts: Jocys, Mikštas 8		Pts: Sitnik 4

Jahrhunderthalle, Bochum
Referees: Andrada Csender (ROU), Karim Soliman (EGY)

=== Group D ===
Pos	Team	Pld	W	L	PF	PA	PD	Qualification
1	Mongolia	2	2	0	42	32	+10	Qualification for quarterfinals
2	Germany	2	1	1	34	27	+7	Qualification for play-in games
3	India	2	0	2	25	42	−17	Qualification for play-in games

Source: rhineruhr2025

18 July 2025
11:45

Boxscore

Germany	21–6	India
Pts: Meyer 9		Pts: Ganesan 3

Jahrhunderthalle, Bochum
Referees: Marie-Pier Houlé (CAN), Karim Soliman (EGY)

18 July 2025
15:25

Boxscore

Mongolia	21–19	India
Pts: Uuganbayar 10		Pts: Rajasekar 9

Jahrhunderthalle, Bochum
Referees: Tojonirina Andriamanantso (MAD), Jennifer Beaudevin (FRA)

18 July 2025
20:25

Boxscore

Germany	13–21	Mongolia
Pts: Beikame 8		Pts: Munkhtur 8

Jahrhunderthalle, Bochum
Referees: Jennifer Beaudevin (FRA), Andrada Csender (ROU)

== Knockout stage ==
=== Bracket ===
Play-in games
19 July
B2 Czech Republic	21
C3 South Africa	9
19 July
C2 Poland	21
B3 Egypt	16
19 July
D2 Germany	21
A3 Chile	11
19 July
A2 Italy	21
D3 India	7

Quarterfinals
19 July
D1 Mongolia	10
B2 Czech Republic	21
19 July
A1 United States	21
C2 Poland	14
19 July
B1 France	18
D2 Germany	19
19 July
C1 Lithuania	21
A2 Italy	20

Semifinals
20 July
B2 Czech Republic	17
A1 United States	19
20 July
D2 Germany	13
C1 Lithuania	21

Final
20 July
A1 United States	16
C1 Lithuania	21
3rd place
20 July
B2 Czech Republic	21
D2 Germany	17

=== Play-in games ===
19 July 2025
12:10

Boxscore

Czech Republic	21–9	South Africa
Pts: Růžička 8		Pts: Mkhwanazi 5

Jahrhunderthalle, Bochum
Referees: Jennifer Beaudevin (FRA), Li Caiyan (CHN)

19 July 2025
12:35

Boxscore

Poland	21–16	Egypt
Pts: Sitnik 8		Pts: Abdelmaged 8

Jahrhunderthalle, Bochum
Referees: Tojonirina Andriamanantso (MAD), Henning Fröhlich (GER)

19 July 2025
14:10

Boxscore

Germany	21–11	Chile
Pts: Schultz 9		Pts: Ordoñez 4

Jahrhunderthalle, Bochum
Referees: Andrada Csender (ROU), Marie-Pier Houlé (CAN)

19 July 2025
14:35

Boxscore

Italy	21–7	India
Pts: Rashed 11		Pts: Ganesan 3

Jahrhunderthalle, Bochum
Referees: Rauno Peerandi (EST), Karim Soliman (EGY)

=== Quarterfinals ===
19 July 2025
17:20

Boxscore

Mongolia	10–21	Czech Republic
Pts: Lhagvaa 6		Pts: Růžička, Žák 7

Jahrhunderthalle, Bochum
Referees: Tojonirina Andriamanantso (MAD), Henning Fröhlich (GER)

19 July 2025
17:45

Boxscore

United States	21–14	Poland
Pts: Brown 8		Pts: Ziółkowski, Sobiech 5

Jahrhunderthalle, Bochum
Referees: Jennifer Beaudevin (FRA), Rauno Peerandi (EST)

19 July 2025
20:00

Boxscore

France	18–19	Germany
Pts: Pasquier 7		Pts: Schultz, Beikame 7

Jahrhunderthalle, Bochum
Referees: Andrada Csender (ROU), Marie-Pier Houlé (CAN)

19 July 2025
20:25

Boxscore

Lithuania	21–20	Italy
Pts: Januševičius 11		Pts: Donadio 9

Jahrhunderthalle, Bochum
Referees: Li Caiyan (CHN), Karim Soliman (EGY)

=== Semifinals ===
20 July 2025
12:40

Boxscore

Czech Republic	17–19	United States
Pts: Růžička 9		Pts: Townsend 7

Jahrhunderthalle, Bochum
Referees: Henning Fröhlich (GER), Li Caiyan (CHN)

20 July 2025
13:05

Boxscore

Germany	13–21	Lithuania
Pts: Beikame 6		Pts: Jocys, Januševičius, Čelka 6

Jahrhunderthalle, Bochum
Referees: Jennifer Beaudevin (FRA), Rauno Peerandi (EST)

=== Bronze medal game ===
20 July 2025
15:40

Boxscore

Czech Republic	21–17	Germany
Pts: Růžička 7		Pts: Beikame 7

Jahrhunderthalle, Bochum
Referees: Andrada Csender (ROU), Rauno Peerandi (EST)

=== Gold medal game ===
20 July 2025
17:40

Boxscore

United States	16–21	Lithuania
Pts: Townsend 7		Pts: Jocys, Mikštas, Januševičius 6

Jahrhunderthalle, Bochum
Referees: Jennifer Beaudevin (FRA), Henning Fröhlich (GER)

== Final standings ==
Place	Team	Record
1st place, gold medalist(s)	Lithuania	5–0
2nd place, silver medalist(s)	United States	4–1
3rd place, bronze medalist(s)	Czech Republic	4–2
4	Germany	3–3
5	France	2–1
6	Mongolia	2–1
7	Italy	2–2
8	Poland	2–2
9	Egypt	0–3
10	South Africa	0–3
11	Chile	0–3
12	India	0–3
