= 3x3 basketball at the 2025 Summer World University Games – Women's tournament =

Women's 3x3 tournament at the 2025 Summer World University Games
- Venue: Jahrhunderthalle
- Location: Bochum
- Dates: 17—20 July 2025
- Nations: 16

Medalists
| gold medal | Germany |
| silver medal | China |
| bronze medal | United States |

The women's 3x3 tournament in basketball at the 2025 Summer Universiade in Rhine-Ruhr, Germany was held from 17 to 20 July 2025. This was the first edition of 3x3 basketball at the Summer World University Games.

== Rosters ==
| Seed | Team | Players | | | |
|---|---|---|---|---|---|
| 1 | China | Wang Xiaoqing | Liu Bei | Zhang Tao | Gao Ziyue |
| 2 | France | Lisa Dufon | Philippine Delpech | Emma Quattara | Julia Saillard |
| 3 | Germany | Laura Zolper | Elisa Mevius | Luisa Nufer | Sarah Polleros |
| 4 | United States | Jaclyn Grisdale | Cecelia Collins | Talya Brugler | Lee Volker |
| 5 | Poland | Marta Stawicka | Julia Bazan | Aleksandra Pszczolarska | Aleksandra Ziemborska |
| 6 | Italy | Kenko Ngamene Takougang | Caterina Logoh | Eva Lizzi | Giulia Bongiorno |
| 7 | Czech Republic | Jesika Híbalová | Kateřina Galíčková | Jindřiška Hrubá | Eliška Brejchová |
| 8 | Hungary | Mia Dávid | Anna Dénes | Tamara Szerencsés | Panna Zsámár |
| 9 | Mongolia | Enkhsolongo Ganbat | Solongo Altantuya | Namuunaa Altantugs | Javzandulam Lkhagva-Ochir |
| 10 | Chile | Paloma Martínez | Javiera Campos | Antonia Andaur | Leyla Olivares |
| 11 | New Zealand | Kate Herman | Mayako Taingahue | Alexa Duff | Carly Ohia |
| 12 | South Africa | Caroline Maine | Lindokuhle Nkabini | Talita Memani | Thoriso Kotsane |

== Preliminary round ==
=== Group A ===
| Pos | Team | Pld | W | L | PF | PA | PD | Qualification |
|---|---|---|---|---|---|---|---|---|
| 1 | China | 2 | 2 | 0 | 42 | 23 | +19 | Qualification for quarterfinals |
| 2 | Hungary | 2 | 1 | 1 | 34 | 33 | +1 | Qualification for play-in games |
| 3 | Mongolia | 2 | 0 | 2 | 21 | 41 | −20 | Qualification for play-in games |

Source: rhineruhr2025

17 July 2025
10:30

Boxscore

| China | 21–9 | Mongolia |
| Pts: Wang 8 | | Pts: Lkhagva-Ochir 7 |

Jahrhunderthalle, Bochum
Referees: Tojonirina Andriamanantso (MAD), Andrada Csender (ROU)

17 July 2025
14:10

Boxscore

| Hungary | 20–12 | Mongolia |
| Pts: Dávid 8 | | Pts: Ganbat, Altantugs 4 |

Jahrhunderthalle, Bochum
Referees: Jennifer Beaudevin (FRA), Henning Frölich (GER)

17 July 2025
17:25

Boxscore

| China | 21–14 | Hungary |
| Pts: Zhao 9 | | Pts: Szerencsés 8 |

Jahrhunderthalle, Bochum
Referees: Rauno Peerandi (EST), Karim Soliman (EGY)

=== Group B ===
| Pos | Team | Pld | W | L | PF | PA | PD | Qualification |
|---|---|---|---|---|---|---|---|---|
| 1 | Czech Republic | 2 | 2 | 0 | 41 | 21 | +20 | Qualification for quarterfinals |
| 2 | France | 2 | 1 | 1 | 29 | 31 | −2 | Qualification for play-in games |
| 3 | Chile | 2 | 0 | 2 | 23 | 41 | −18 | Qualification for play-in games |

Source: rhineruhr2025

18 July 2025
10:30

Boxscore

| France | 20–11 | Chile |
| Pts: Delpech 14 | | Pts: Campos 7 |

Jahrhunderthalle, Bochum
Referees: Henning Frölich (GER), Li Caiyan (CHN)

18 July 2025
14:10

Boxscore

| Czech Republic | 21–12 | Chile |
| Pts: Galíčková 8 | | Pts: Campos 7 |

Jahrhunderthalle, Bochum
Referees: Marie-Pier Houle (CAN), Karim Soliman (EGY)

18 July 2025
19:10

Boxscore

| France | 9–20 | Czech Republic |
| Pts: Dufon, Delpech 3 | | Pts: Brejchová 10 |

Jahrhunderthalle, Bochum
Referees: Tojonirina Andriamanantso (MAD), Rauno Peerandi (EST)

=== Group C ===
| Pos | Team | Pld | W | L | PF | PA | PD | Qualification |
|---|---|---|---|---|---|---|---|---|
| 1 | Germany | 2 | 2 | 0 | 37 | 19 | +18 | Qualification for quarterfinals |
| 2 | Italy | 2 | 1 | 1 | 29 | 25 | +4 | Qualification for play-in games |
| 3 | New Zealand | 2 | 0 | 2 | 16 | 38 | −22 | Qualification for play-in games |

Source: rhineruhr2025

17 July 2025
10:55

Boxscore

| Germany | 21–7 | New Zealand |
| Pts: Polleros 7 | | Pts: Herman 6 |

Jahrhunderthalle, Bochum
Referees: Jennifer Beaudevin (FRA), Marie-Pier Houle (CAN)

17 July 2025
14:35

Boxscore

| Italy | 17–9 | New Zealand |
| Pts: Ngamene Takougang 7 | | Pts: Ohia 6 |

Jahrhunderthalle, Bochum
Referees: Tojonirina Andriamanantso (MAD), Marie-Pier Houle (CAN)

17 July 2025
17:50

Boxscore

| Germany | 16–12 | Italy |
| Pts: Mevius 6 | | Pts: Lizzi 5 |

Jahrhunderthalle, Bochum
Referees: Andrada Csender (ROU), Li Caiyan (CHN)

=== Group D ===
| Pos | Team | Pld | W | L | PF | PA | PD | Qualification |
|---|---|---|---|---|---|---|---|---|
| 1 | United States | 2 | 2 | 0 | 35 | 21 | +14 | Qualification for quarterfinals |
| 2 | Poland | 2 | 1 | 1 | 32 | 24 | +8 | Qualification for play-in games |
| 3 | South Africa | 2 | 0 | 2 | 20 | 42 | −22 | Qualification for play-in games |

Source: rhineruhr2025

18 July 2025
10:55

Boxscore

| United States | 21–10 | South Africa |
| Pts: Brugler 7 | | Pts: Maine 6 |

Jahrhunderthalle, Bochum
Referees: Li Caiyan (CHN), Karim Soliman (EGY)

18 July 2025
14:35

Boxscore

| Poland | 21–10 | South Africa |
| Pts: Pszczolarska 9 | | Pts: Memani 4 |

Jahrhunderthalle, Bochum
Referees: Henning Frölich (GER), Li Caiyan (CHN)

18 July 2025
19:35

Boxscore

| United States | 14–11 | Poland |
| Pts: Volker 6 | | Pts: Pszczolarska 5 |

Jahrhunderthalle, Bochum
Referees: Tojonirina Andriamanantso (MAD), Jennifer Beaudevin (FRA)

== Knockout stage ==
=== Bracket ===
Play-in games
19 July
A2 Hungary | 21
D3 South Africa | 6
19 July
D2 Poland | 21
A3 Mongolia | 6
19 July
C2 Italy | 21
B3 Chile | 15
19 July
B2 France | 21
C3 New Zealand | 16

Quarterfinals
19 July
C1 Germany | 21
A2 Hungary | 11
19 July
B1 Czech Republic | 21
D2 Poland | 16
19 July
A1 China | 18
C2 Italy | 12
19 July
D1 United States | 21
B2 France | 6

Semifinals
20 July
C1 Germany | 21
B1 Czech Republic | 15
20 July
A1 China | 21
D1 United States | 16

Final
20 July
C1 Germany | 21
A1 China | 15
3rd place
20 July
B1 Czech Republic | 10
D1 United States | 13

=== Play-in games ===
19 July 2025
11:20

Boxscore

| Hungary | 21–6 | South Africa |
| Pts: Zsámár, Dénes, Szerencsés 6 | | Pts: Maine, Nkabini, Memani 2 |

Jahrhunderthalle, Bochum
Referees: Marie-Pier Houle (CAN), Rauno Peerandi (EST)

19 July 2025
11:45

Boxscore

| Poland | 21–6 | Mongolia |
| Pts: Stawicka, Ziemborska 7 | | Pts: Altantuya, Lkhagva-Ochir 2 |

Jahrhunderthalle, Bochum
Referees: Henning Frölich (GER), Li Caiyan (CHN)

19 July 2025
13:10

Boxscore

| Italy | 21–15 | Chile |
| Pts: Lizzi 9 | | Pts: Andaur 7 |

Jahrhunderthalle, Bochum
Referees: Tojonirina Andriamanantso (MAD), Jennifer Beaudevin (FRA)

19 July 2025
13:35

Boxscore

| France | 21–16 | New Zealand |
| Pts: Dufon 9 | | Pts: Herman 8 |

Jahrhunderthalle, Bochum
Referees: Andrada Csender (ROU), Karim Soliman (EGY)

=== Quarterfinals ===
19 July 2025
15:00

Boxscore

| Germany | 21–11 | Hungary |
| Pts: Zolper 9 | | Pts: Szerencsés 7 |

Jahrhunderthalle, Bochum
Referees: Jennifer Beaudevin (FRA), Li Caiyan (CHN)

19 July 2025
15:25

Boxscore

| Czech Republic | 21–16 | Poland |
| Pts: Hrubá 7 | | Pts: Bazan, Ziemborska 6 |

Jahrhunderthalle, Bochum
Referees: Tojonirina Andriamanantso (MAD), Marie-Pier Houle (CAN)

19 July 2025
19:10

Boxscore

| China | 18–12 | Italy |
| Pts: Liu 6 | | Pts: Ngamene Takougang 4 |

Jahrhunderthalle, Bochum
Referees: Andrada Csender (ROU), Karim Soliman (EGY)

19 July 2025
19:35

Boxscore

| United States | 21–6 | France |
| Pts: Volker 7 | | Pts: Ouattara 3 |

Jahrhunderthalle, Bochum
Referees: Henning Frölich (GER), Rauno Peerandi (EST)

=== Semifinals ===
20 July 2025
11:50

Boxscore

| Germany | 21–15 | Czech Republic |
| Pts: Zolper 11 | | Pts: Híbalová, Brejchová 5 |

Jahrhunderthalle, Bochum
Referees: Marie-Pier Houle (CAN), Karim Soliman (EGY)

20 July 2025
12:15

Boxscore

| China | 21–16 | United States |
| Pts: Liu 9 | | Pts: Collins 6 |

Jahrhunderthalle, Bochum
Referees: Tojonirina Andriamanantso (MAD), Andrada Csender (ROU)

=== Bronze medal game ===
20 July 2025
15:15

Boxscore

| Czech Republic | 10–13 | United States |
| Pts: Híbalová 5 | | Pts: Collins 6 |

Jahrhunderthalle, Bochum
Referees: Li Caiyan (CHN), Karim Soliman (EGY)

=== Gold medal game ===
20 July 2025
17:15

Boxscore

| Germany | 21–15 | China |
| Pts: Zolper, Polleros 7 | | Pts: Liu 6 |

Jahrhunderthalle, Bochum
Referees: Tojonirina Andriamanantso (MAD), Marie-Pier Houle (CAN)

== Final standings ==
| Place | Team | Record |
|---|---|---|
| 1st place, gold medalist(s) | Germany | 5–0 |
| 2nd place, silver medalist(s) | China | 4–1 |
| 3rd place, bronze medalist(s) | United States | 4–1 |
| 4 | Czech Republic | 3–2 |
| 5 | Poland | 2–2 |
| 6 | Hungary | 2–2 |
| 7 | Italy | 2–2 |
| 8 | France | 2–2 |
| 9 | Chile | 0–3 |
| 10 | New Zealand | 0–3 |
| 11 | Mongolia | 0–3 |
| 12 | South Africa | 0–3 |
