= Swimming at the 2025 Summer World University Games =

International swimming championship event

- Venue: Europe SportPark Aquatics Centre
- Dates: 17–23 July 2025
- Nations: 65

Swimming took place at the 2025 Summer World University Games from 17 to 23 July 2025 at the Europe SportPark Aquatics Centre in Berlin, Germany.

== Medal table ==
* Host nation (Germany)

Rank	Nation	Gold	Silver	Bronze	Total
1	United States	27	12	11	50
2	Japan	3	5	7	15
3	Italy	3	4	6	13
–	Individual Neutral Athletes	3	2	1	6
4	South Africa	2	2	4	8
5	China	1	3	0	4
6	Portugal	1	1	0	2
7	Czech Republic	1	0	0	1
7	Kyrgyzstan	1	0	0	1
9	Poland	0	4	3	7
10	South Korea	0	1	2	3
11	Australia	0	1	1	2
11	France	0	1	1	2
11	Uzbekistan	0	1	1	2
14	Chinese Taipei	0	1	0	1
14	Germany*	0	1	0	1
14	Hong Kong	0	1	0	1
14	Hungary	0	1	0	1
14	Malaysia	0	1	0	1
19	Canada	0	0	2	2
20	Brazil	0	0	1	1
20	Lithuania	0	0	1	1
20	Spain	0	0	1	1
Totals (22 entries)		42	42	42	126

== Medal summary ==
=== Men's events ===
Event	Gold		Silver		Bronze	
50 m freestyle	Matthew King; United States	21.84	Giovanni Guatti; Italy	22.01	Jokūbas Keblys; Lithuania	22.02
100 m freestyle	Matthew King; United States	48.01	Pieter Coetze; South Africa	48.12	Aleksandr Shchegolev; Individual Neutral Athletes	48.34
200 m freestyle	Jake Mitchell; United States	1:46.22	Nikolai Kolesnikov; Individual Neutral Athletes	1:46.77	Baylor Nelson; United States	1:46.81
400 m freestyle	Nikolai Kolesnikov; Individual Neutral Athletes	3:46.66	Khiew Hoe Yean; Malaysia	3:47.38	Ryan Erisman; United States	3:47.52
800 m freestyle	Aleksandr Stepanov; Individual Neutral Athletes	7:46.51	Tommaso Griffante; Italy	7:50.50	Ryan Erisman; United States	7:51.74
1500 m freestyle	Aleksandr Stepanov; Individual Neutral Athletes	14:55.98	Ivan Giovannoni; Italy	14:56.10	Davide Marchello; Italy	15:06.95
50 m backstroke	Pieter Coetze; South Africa	24.49	Yoon Ji-hwan; South Korea	24.51	Daniel Diehl; United States	24.75
100 m backstroke	Pieter Coetze; South Africa	51.99 GR, AF	Will Modglin; United States	52.54	Daniel Diehl; United States	52.94
200 m backstroke	Daniel Diehl; United States	1:55.91	David King; United States	1:56.00	Mathys Chouchaoui; France	1:58.08
50 m breaststroke	Federico Rizzardi; Italy	27.14	Reo Okura; Japan	27.33	Dawid Wiekiera; Poland	27.46
100 m breaststroke	Denis Petrashov; Kyrgyzstan	59.32	Dawid Wiekiera; Poland	59.66	Ben Delmar; United States	59.80
200 m breaststroke	Ben Delmar; United States	2:09.50	Adam Mak Sai-ting; Hong Kong	2:10.53	Dawid Wiekiera; Poland	2:10.54
50 m butterfly	Simone Stefanì; Italy	23.28	Eldorbek Usmonov; Uzbekistan	23.33	Lorenzo Gargani; Italy	23.42
100 m butterfly	Gianmarco Sansone; Italy	51.40	Björn Kammann; Germany	51.70	Eldorbek Usmonov; Uzbekistan	51.84
200 m butterfly	Jack Dahlgren; United States	1:55.59	Wang Kuan-hung; Chinese Taipei	1:55.85	Mason Laur; United States	1:56.50
200 m individual medley	Takumi Mori; Japan	1:57.24 GR	Mitchell Schott; United States	1:58.25	Yuta Watanabe; Japan	1:58.54
400 m individual medley	Takumi Mori; Japan	4:12.54	Riku Yamaguchi; Japan	4:12.66	Baylor Nelson; United States	4:12.69
4 × 100 m freestyle relay	United States; Matthew King; Mitchell Schott; Owen West; David King; Camden Taylor^{[a]}	3:12.36	Japan; Takumi Mori; Takaki Hara; Yuta Watanabe; Konosuke Yanagimoto; Shoon Mitsunaga^{[a]}	3:14.19	Brazil; Lucas Peixoto; Kaique Alves; Vinícius Assunção; Pedro Souza; Theo Garcia Alloza^{[a]}	3:15.02
4 × 200 m freestyle relay	United States; Baylor Nelson; Mitchell Schott; Jack Dahlgren; Jake Mitchell; Owen West^{[a]} Ryan Erisman^{[a]}	7:04.51 GR	Individual Neutral Athletes; Nikolai Kolesnikov; Aleksandr Shchegolev; Dmitrii Zhavoronkov; Aleksandr Stepanov; Roman Akimov^{[a]}	7:08.33	Japan; Takumi Mori; Takaki Hara; Konosuke Yanagimoto; Hiroto Shimizu; Yuta Watanabe^{[a]}	7:09.47
4 × 100 m medley relay	United States; William Modglin; Benjamin Delmar; Kamal Muhammad; Matt King; Owen McDonald^{[a]} Nathaniel Germonprez^{[a]} Matthew Klinge^{[a]} Mitchel Schott^{[a]}	3:33.59	Italy; Pietro Ubertalli; Alessandro Fusco; Gianmarco Sansone; Lorenzo Actis Dato; Simone Stefanì^{[a]} Flavio Mangiamele^{[a]} Michele Busa^{[a]} Giovanni Caserta^{[a]}	3:34.70	Japan; Yuga Nishimura; Reo Okura; Riku Kitagawa; Takaki Hara; Yusuke Sato^{[a]} Yuma Yoshida^{[a]} Riku Kitagawa^{[a]}	3:34.97
AF African record | AM Americas record | AS Asian record | ER European record | OC Oceania record | UR Universiade record | WR World record | NR National record

^{a} Swimmers who participated in the heats only and received medals.

=== Women's events ===
Event	Gold		Silver		Bronze	
50 m freestyle	Maxine Parker; United States	24.54	Julia Dennis; United States	24.58	Olivia Nel; South Africa	24.82
100 m freestyle	Ai Yanhan; China	54.00	Lison Nowaczyk; France	54.23	Maxine Parker; United States	54.30
200 m freestyle	Cavan Gormsen; United States	1:57.21	Ai Yanhan; China	1:57.55	Isabel Ivey; United States	1:57.58
400 m freestyle	Francisca Martins; Portugal	4:07.50 NR	Cavan Gormsen; United States	4:07.64	Michaela Mattes; United States	4:09.88
800 m freestyle	Mila Nikanorov; United States	8:27.61	Francisca Martins; Portugal	8:30.76	Ruka Takezawa; Japan	8:30.95
1500 m freestyle	Kate Hurst; United States	16:15.40	Genevieve Jorgenson; United States	16:15.44	Niko Aoki; Japan	16:19.81
50 m backstroke	Leah Shackley; United States	27.31 GR	Kennedy Noble; United States	27.67	Olivia Nel; South Africa	27.91 AF
100 m backstroke	Kennedy Noble; United States	58.78 GR	Leah Shackley; United States	59.13	Lee Eun-ji; South Korea	1:00.23
200 m backstroke	Leah Shackley; United States	2:05.99 GR	Kennedy Noble; United States	2:07.82	Lee Eun-ji; South Korea	2:08.29 NR
50 m breaststroke	Emma Weber; United States	30.61	Lara van Niekerk; South Africa	30.68	Barbara Mazurkiewicz; Poland	30.76
100 m breaststroke	Emma Weber; United States	1:07.09	Barbara Mazurkiewicz; Poland	1:07.57	Shona Branton; Canada	1:07.75
200 m breaststroke	Yumeno Kusuda; Japan	2:26.15	Yuyumi Obatake; Japan	2:28.17	Aina González; Spain	2:28.48
50 m butterfly	Daryna Nabojčenko; Czech Republic	26.09	Josephine Crimmins; Australia	26.27	Viola Scotto Di Carlo; Italy	26.30
100 m butterfly	Leah Shackley; United States	58.16	Beatrix Tanko; Hungary	58.55	Josephine Crimmins; Australia	58.62
200 m butterfly	Tess Howley; United States	2:05.69	Lindsay Looney; United States	2:07.79	Paola Borrelli; Italy	2:08.00
200 m individual medley	Leah Hayes; United States	2:09.48 GR	Teagan O'Dell; United States	2:11.24	Ashley Mcmillan; Canada	2:12.63
400 m individual medley	Leah Hayes; United States	4:36.04	Teagan O'Dell; United States	4:39.96	Ayami Suzuki; Japan	4:40.62
4 × 100 m freestyle relay	United States; Maxine Parker; Caroline Larsen; Julia Dennis; Isabel Ivey; Leah Hayes^{[a]}	3:36.21 GR	China; Liu Shuhan; Ge Chutong; Yu Liyan; Ai Yanhan	3:38.70	Italy; Giulia D'Innocenzo; Federica Toma; Viola Scotto Di Carlo; Agata Maria Ambler	3:39.86
4 × 200 m freestyle relay	United States; Leah Hayes; Cavan Gormsen; Lindsay Looney; Isabel Ivey; Michaela Mattes^{[a]}	7:52.56 GR	China; Liu Shuhan; Ge Chutong; Yu Liyan; Ai Yanhan	7:57.91	Japan; Ruka Takezawa; Rio Suzuki; Hanane Hironaka; Kanon Nagao; Riko Sawano^{[a]} Sakura Ohshima^{[a]}	7:59.99
4 × 100 m medley relay	United States; Kennedy Noble; Emma Weber; Leah Shackley; Maxine Parker; Teagan O'Dell^{[a]} Leah Hayes^{[a]} Ella Welch^{[a]} Isabel Ivey^{[a]}	3:59.68	Poland; Adela Piskorska; Barbara Mazurkiewicz; Wiktoria Piotrowska; Julia Maik; Natalia Janiszewska^{[a]} Gabriela Krol^{[a]} Aleksandra Polanska^{[a]}	4:01.33	Italy; Federica Toma; Francesca Zucca; Viola Scotto Di Carlo; Agata Ambler; Francesca Pasquino^{[a]} Chiara Della Corte^{[a]} Giulia Caprai^{[a]} Giulia D'Innocenzo^{[a]}	4:01.45
AF African record | AM Americas record | AS Asian record | ER European record | OC Oceania record | UR Universiade record | WR World record | NR National record

^{a} Swimmers who participated in the heats only and received medals.

=== Mixed events ===
Event	Gold		Silver		Bronze	
4 × 100 m freestyle relay	United States; Matthew King; David King; Isabel Ivey; Maxine Parker; Owen West^{[a]} Mitchell Schott^{[a]} Caroline Larsen^{[a]} Julia Dennis^{[a]}	3:24.27 GR	Japan; Takumi Mori; Takaki Hara; Ayu Mizoguchi; Rio Suzuki; Konosuke Yanagimoto^{[a]} Yuta Watanabe^{[a]} Sakura Ohshima^{[a]}	3:26.86	South Africa; Ruard Van Renen; Guy Brooks; Olivia Nel; Michaela De Villiers; Georgia Nel^{[a]} Owethu Mahan^{[a]}	3:28.51 NR
4 × 100 m medley relay	United States; William Modglin; Ben Delmar; Leah Shackley; Maxine Parker; David King^{[a]} Nate Germonprez^{[a]} Ella Welch^{[a]} Isabel Ivey^{[a]}	3:44.40	Poland; Dawid Wiekiera; Adrian Jaskiewicz; Adela Piskorska; Julia Maik; Aleksander Sienkiewicz^{[a]} Barbara Mazurkiewicz^{[a]} Wiktoria Piotrowska^{[a]} Dominik Dudys^{[a]}	3:47.14	South Africa; Ruard Van Renen; Guy Brooks; Simone Moll; Olivia Nel; Michaela De Villiers^{[a]}	3:48.34
AF African record | AM Americas record | AS Asian record | ER European record | OC Oceania record | UR Universiade record | WR World record | NR National record

^{a} Swimmers who participated in the heats only and received medals.

== General references ==
- Results book
