= Swimming at the 2023 Pan American Games – Women's 100 metre backstroke =

Women's 100 metre backstroke at the 2023 Pan American Games
- Venue: Aquatic Center
- Date: October 25, 2023
- Competitors: 26 from 19 nations
- Winning time: 59.67

Medalists
Gold medal	Josephine Fuller	United States
Silver medal	Kennedy Noble	United States
Bronze medal	Danielle Hanus	Canada

The women's 100 metre backstroke competition of the swimming events at the 2023 Pan American Games were held on October 25, 2023, at the Aquatic Center in Santiago, Chile.

== Records ==
World record	Kaylee McKeown (AUS)	57.45	Adelaide, Australia	June 13, 2021
Pan American Games record	Phoebe Bacon (USA)	59.02	Lima, Peru	August 10, 2019

== Results ==
KEY:	QA	Qualified for A final	QB	Qualified for B final	GR	Games record	NR	National record	PB	Personal best	SB	Seasonal best

=== Heats ===
The first round was held on October 25.

Rank	Heat	Lane	Name	Nationality	Time	Notes
1	3	4	Josephine Fuller	United States	1:00.17	QA
2	4	4	Kennedy Noble	United States	1:00.29	QA
3	4	5	Madelyn Gatrall	Canada	1:01.79	QA
4	3	5	Miranda Grana	Mexico	1:01.97	QA
5	2	6	Carla González	Venezuela	1:02.09	QA
6	2	4	Danielle Hanus	Canada	1:02.14	QA
7	2	7	Isabella Arcila	Colombia	1:02.20	QA
8	4	6	Emma Harvey	Bermuda	1:02.42	QA
9	2	5	Andrea Berrino	Argentina	1:02.53	QB
10	3	3	Julia Karla Góes	Brazil	1:03.02	QB
11	3	2	Andrea Sansores	Mexico	1:03.10	QB
12	2	2	McKenna DeBever	Peru	1:03.23	QB
13	4	3	Athena Meneses	Mexico	1:03.24	QB
14	2	3	Maria Luiza Pessanha	Brazil	1:03.5	QB
15	3	6	Abril Aunchayna	Uruguay	1:03.76	QB
16	3	8	Celina Márquez	El Salvador	1:03.97	QB
17	4	2	Alexia Sotomayor	Peru	1:04.08	
18	1	4	Melissa Diego Pierri	Independent Athletes Team	1:04.40	
19	3	7	Elizabeth Jimenez	Dominican Republic	1:04.43	
20	4	7	Danielle Titus	Barbados	1:04.66	
21	2	1	Sarah Szklaruk	Chile	1:04.71	
22	4	1	Andrea Becali	Cuba	1:05.11	
23	3	1	Carolina Cermelli	Panama	1:06.18	
24	1	3	Leanna Wainwright	Jamaica	1:06.20	
25	4	8	Maria Jose Arrua	Paraguay	1:06.47	
26	1	5	Martina Röper Joo	Chile	1:07.94	

=== Final B ===
The B final was also held on October 25.

Rank	Lane	Name	Nationality	Time	Notes
9	7	Maria Luiza Pessanha	Brazil	1:02.42	
10	3	Andrea Sansores	Mexico	1:02.81	
11	2	Athena Meneses	Mexico	1:02.97	
12	4	Andrea Berrino	Argentina	1:03.21	
13	1	Abril Aunchayna	Uruguay	1:03.23	
14	5	Julia Karla Góes	Brazil	1:03.47	
15	6	McKenna DeBever	Peru	1:03.54	
16	8	Celina Marquez	El Salvador	1:04.12	

=== Final A ===
The A final was also held on October 25.

Rank	Lane	Name	Nationality	Time	Notes
1st place, gold medalist(s)	4	Josephine Fuller	United States	59.67	
2nd place, silver medalist(s)	5	Kennedy Noble	United States	59.84	
3rd place, bronze medalist(s)	7	Danielle Hanus	Canada	1:01.49	
4	3	Madelyn Gatrall	Canada	1:01.50	
5	6	Miranda Grana	Mexico	1:01.51	
6	2	Carla González	Venezuela	1:01.92	
7	1	Isabella Arcila	Colombia	1:02.19	
8	8	Emma Harvey	Bermuda	1:02.35	NR
