= Swimming at the 2023 Pan American Games – Women's 200 metre individual medley =

Women's 200 metre individual medley at the 2023 Pan American Games
- Venue: Aquatic Centre
- Date: October 25
- Competitors: 25 from 19 nations
- Winning time: 2:09.04

Medalists
Gold medal	Sydney Pickrem	Canada
Silver medal	Mary-Sophie Harvey	Canada
Bronze medal	Kennedy Noble	United States

The women's 200 metre individual medley competition of the swimming events at the 2023 Pan American Games were held on October 25, 2023, at the Aquatic Center in Santiago, Chile.

== Records ==
Prior to this competition, the existing world and Pan American Games records were as follows:

World record	Katinka Hosszu (HUN)	2:06.12	Kazan, Russia	August 3, 2015
Pan American Games record	Caitlin Leverenz (USA)	2:10.51	Toronto, Canada	July 18, 2015

== Results ==
KEY:	QA	Qualified for A final	QB	Qualified for B final	GR	Games record	NR	National record	PB	Personal best	SB	Seasonal best

=== Heats ===
The highest eight scores advance to the final.

Rank	Heat	Lane	Name	Nationality	Time	Notes
1	4	4	Sydney Pickrem	Canada	2:14.41	QA
2	4	3	Kennedy Noble	United States	2:15.23	QA
3	2	5	Kristen Romano	Puerto Rico	2:15.98	QA
4	2	4	Abby Harter	United States	2:16.81	QA
5	3	4	Mary-Sophie Harvey	Canada	2:16.94	QA
6	2	3	Stefanía Gómez	Colombia	2:17.08	QA
7	4	6	McKenna DeBever	Peru	2:17.58	QA
8	3	5	Gabrielle Roncatto	Brazil	2:18.28	QA
9	4	5	Bruna Leme	Brazil	2:18.63	QB
10	4	2	María Mata	Mexico	2:20.36	QB
11	3	3	Florencia Perotti	Argentina	2:21.67	QB
12	2	2	Magdalena Portela	Argentina	2:22.37	QB
13	3	2	Laura Melo	Colombia	2:22.38	QB
14	2	6	Nicole Frank	Uruguay	2:22.76	QB
15	2	7	Jade Foelske	Ecuador	2:23.86	QB
16	2	7	Daine Pedré	Cuba	2:24.26	QB
17	4	7	Alondra Ortiz	Costa Rica	2:24.60	
18	4	1	Lucero Mejía	Independent Athletes Team	2:25.76	
19	1	5	Sierrah Broadbelt	Cayman Islands	2:29.56	
20	1	4	María José Arrua	Paraguay	2:29.60	
21	2	1	Sarah Szklaruk	Chile	2:30.33	
22	4	8	Monstserrat Spielmann	Chile	2:30.33	
23	3	1	Zaylie Thompson	Bahamas	2:30.53	
24	1	3	Paola Cwu	Honduras	2:33.54	
	3	6	Melissa Rodríguez	Mexico	DNS	

=== Final B ===
The B final was held on October 21.

Rank	Lane	Name	Nationality	Time	Notes
9	4	Bruna Leme	Brazil	2:17.55	
10	3	Magdalena Portela	Argentina	2:19.38	
11	6	Laura Melo	Colombia	2:20.92	
12	2	Nicole Frank	Uruguay	2:20.97	
13	7	Jade Foelske	Ecuador	2:21.92	
14	5	Florencia Perotti	Argentina	2:23.19	
15	8	Lucero Mejía	Independent Athletes Team	2:23.62	
16	1	Daine Pedré	Cuba	2:26.29	

=== Final A ===
The A final was held on October 21.

Rank	Lane	Name	Nationality	Time	Notes
1st place, gold medalist(s)	4	Sydney Pickrem	Canada	2:09.04	PR
2nd place, silver medalist(s)	2	Mary-Sophie Harvey	Canada	2:11.92	
3rd place, bronze medalist(s)	5	Kennedy Noble	United States	2:14.19	
4	3	Kristen Romano	Puerto Rico	2:15.18	
5	7	Stefanía Gómez	Colombia	2:16.92	
6	6	Abby Harter	United States	2:17.95	
7	8	Gabrielle Roncatto	Brazil	2:18.07	
8	1	McKenna DeBever	Peru	2:18.28	
