= Josephine Fuller =

American swimmer (born 2003)

Josephine Fuller (2 May 2003) is an American swimmer. She won a gold medal in Women's 200 metre backstroke at the 2023 Pan American Games.

She swam for NOVA of Virginia Aquatics. She qualified for the 2020 U.S. Olympic trials. She swims for the University of Tennessee. She competed at the 2023 NCAA Division I Women's Championship, and 2023 US Open Championships.
