= Swimming at the 2023 Pan American Games – Women's 200 metre backstroke =

Women's 200 metre backstroke at the 2023 Pan American Games
- Venue: Aquatic Center
- Date: October 22, 2023
- Competitors: 26 from 18 nations
- Winning time: 2:08.03

Medalists
Gold medal	Kennedy Noble	United States
Silver medal	Reilly Tiltmann	United States
Bronze medal	Alexia Assunção	Brazil

The women's 200 metre backstroke competition of the swimming events at the 2023 Pan American Games were held on October 22, 2023, at the Aquatic Center in Santiago, Chile.

== Records ==
World record	Kaylee McKeown (AUS)	2:03.14	Sydney, Australia	March 10, 2023
Pan American Games record	Hillary Caldwell (CAN)	2:08.22	Toronto, Canada	July 15, 2015

The following record was established during the competition:

Date	Event	Swimmer	Nation	Time	Record
October 22	Final	Kennedy Noble	United States	2:08.03	GR

== Results ==
KEY:	QA	Qualified for A final	QB	Qualified for B final	GR	Games record	NR	National record	PB	Personal best	SB	Seasonal best	WD	Withdrew

=== Heats ===
The first round was held on October 22.

Rank	Heat	Lane	Name	Nationality	Time	Notes
1	4	4	Kennedy Noble	United States	2:13.54	QA
2	2	5	Alexia Assunção	Brazil	2:13.61	QA
3	2	4	Kristen Romano	Puerto Rico	2:15.05	QA
4	3	4	Reilly Tiltmann	United States	2:15.49	QA
5	3	6	Madelyn Gatrall	Canada	2:15.92	QA
6	4	2	McKenna DeBever	Peru	2:16.68	QA
7	3	3	Fernanda de Goeij	Brazil	2:17.49	QA
8	3	5	Malena Santillán	Argentina	2:17.68	QA
9	2	3	Miranda Grana	Mexico	2:17.83	QB
10	2	1	Celina Marquez	El Salvador	2:18.14	QB
11	4	3	Alexia Sotomayor	Peru	2:18.32	QB
12	2	2	Brooklyn Douthwright	Canada	2:18.88	QB
13	4	5	Athena Meneses	Mexico	2:19.57	WD
14	3	2	Candela Raviola	Argentina	2:19.63	QB
15	4	8	Sarah Szklaruk	Chile	2:19.72	QB
16	2	6	Jazmín Pistelli	Colombia	2:20.81	QB
17	3	1	Lucero Mejia	Independent Athletes Team	2:21.09	QB
18	4	7	Carolina Cermelli	Panama	2:21.43	
19	3	8	Abril Aunchayna	Uruguay	2:21.87	
20	4	6	Magaly Gomez Ramos	Mexico	2:22.01	
21	2	7	Elizabeth Jimenez Garrido	Dominican Republic	2:22.11	
22	3	7	Andrea Becali	Cuba	2:22.67	
23	1	4	Martina Röper Joo	Chile	2:25.52	
24	4	1	Danielle Titus	Barbados	2:26.90	
25	1	5	Lara Gimenez	Paraguay	2:29.78	
26	1	3	Leanna Wainwright	Jamaica	2:32.72	

=== Final B ===
The B final was also held on October 22.

Rank	Lane	Name	Nationality	Time	Notes
9	4	Miranda Grana	Mexico	2:14.49	
10	3	Alexia Sotomayor	Peru	2:16.62	
11	2	Candela Raviola	Argentina	2:19.69	
12	6	Brooklyn Douthwright	Canada	2:19.76	
13	5	Celina Marquez	El Salvador	2:20.35	
14	7	Sarah Szklaruk	Chile	2:21.38	
15	8	Lucero Mejia	Independent Athletes Team	2:21.40	
16	1	Jazmín Pistelli	Colombia	2:23.02	

=== Final A ===
The A final was also held on October 25.

Rank	Lane	Name	Nationality	Time	Notes
1st place, gold medalist(s)	4	Kennedy Noble	United States	2:08.03	GR
2nd place, silver medalist(s)	6	Reilly Tiltmann	United States	2:12.79	
3rd place, bronze medalist(s)	5	Alexia Assunção	Brazil	2:13.31	
4	3	Kristen Romano	Puerto Rico	2:14.32	
5	2	Madelyn Gatrall	Canada	2:14.44	
6	8	Malena Santillán	Argentina	2:16.40	
7	7	McKenna DeBever	Peru	2:17.43	
8	1	Fernanda de Goeij	Brazil	2:20.05	
