= Kennedy Noble =

American swimmer

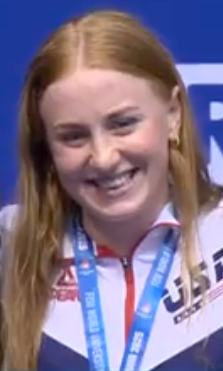
- At the 2025 Summer World University Games

Personal information
- Born: March 16, 2004 (age 22) Goodyear, Arizona, U.S.

Sport
- Sport: Swimming
Medal record
Women's swimming
Representing United States
Pan American Games
Gold medal – first place	2023 Santiago	200 m backstroke
Gold medal – first place	2023 Santiago	4x100 m mixed medley
Silver medal – second place	2023 Santiago	100 m backstroke
Bronze medal – third place	2023 Santiago	200 m medley
World University Games
Gold medal – first place	2025 Rhine-Ruhr	100 m backstroke
Gold medal – first place	2025 Rhine-Ruhr	4x100 m medley
Silver medal – second place	2025 Rhine-Ruhr	50 m backstroke
Silver medal – second place	2025 Rhine-Ruhr	200 m backstroke

Helen Kennedy Noble (born March 16, 2004) is an American swimmer from Arizona, who currently swims for the North Carolina State University Wolfpack. She specializes in the backstroke.

== Early life and education ==
Helen Kennedy Noble was born March 16, 2004. She is from Goodyear, Arizona. Noble is the daughter of Brett Noble and Jana Jones-Lybarger. She was raised in a blended family by Brett Noble and Tara Hankins, as well as Jocelyn and Jana Jones-Lybarger.

Noble has cited her mom, Jana, as a personal inspiration regarding athletics. Jana was a triathlete and Kennedy used to watch her mom train in the pool for hours every day.

Noble began competing at age 9 with a recreational swim team where she excelled. By age 11, she began club swimming with the YMCA Westside Silver Fins. By the age of 13, she was already viewed as an especially strong backstroker.

Just before her freshman year of high school, Noble was named Swimming World’s Up & Comer in August 2018. A few months later, her club coach, Ryan Kent, died. Noble attributes his mentorship for giving her perspective on her achievements and inspiring her love for the sport.

She continued swimming for the Silver Fins under Coach Darian Townsend. Townsend was himself a three-time Olympic swimmer and gold medalist. Noble credited Townsend with giving her helpful techniques to manage the stress and challenges of competing at increasingly elite levels. Noble qualified and swam in the 2020 USA Swimming Olympic Team Trials in Omaha, Nebraska. In 2021, she competed in the World Cups in Budapest and Berlin.

In October 2022, Noble gave her verbal committed to swim for North Carolina State University after her high school graduation. She was the #9 swim recruit in the Class of 2022.

In her senior year of high school, she followed Coach Townsend to the Phoenix Swim Club. During her high school career, Noble set numerous state swim records in Arizona, repeatedly breaking her own records. She is especially noted for her 200 backstroke. In that event, Noble was the bronze medalist at the 2021 World Cup and a semifinalist at the 2021 Olympic Trials. During her high school career, she was an International National Junior Team member in 2021 and 2022, as well as a member of the 2021-2022 Junior National Team member.

Noble graduated from Millennium High School in May 2022. She was honored by the 2022 Arizona High School Sports Awards program as the top female swimmer in the state. She holds state records for 50 and 100 Back, 100 and 200 Fly, as well as 200 IM.

In addition to being an elite athlete, Noble was an honor student in high school. She was a three-time Scholastic All-American.

== Swimming career ==
Noble began her collegiate swimming career at North Carolina State University in Fall 2022. In her freshman year, she achieved a number of accomplishments. She was named the Atlantic Coast Conference Women's Swimmer of the Week on January 31, 2023, after her performance against Duke where she won both the 100-yard and 200-yard backstroke events. She was a member of the 2022-23 Junior National Team. She was an ACC bronze medalist in the 100-yard backstroke and was sixth in the 200-yard IM. At the 2023 NCAA Championships, Noble was named All-American in three individual events, qualified for finals in all of her individual events, placed fifth in the 200-yard backstroke, 11th in the 100-yard backstroke and 14th in the 200-yard IM. Noble ended her freshman year with three individual program top ten times at North Carolina State University: 100-yard backstroke, 200-yard backstroke and 200 IM.

In her sophomore year, she continued to swim well. In October 2023, she represented the U.S. in the Pan American Games, where she won silver in the 100m backstroke and gold in the 200m backstroke. At the 2024 NCAA Championships, she finished third in the 100-yard backstroke and broke a Wolfpack program record in the 200-yard IM. Noble was also an All-American recipient.

Heading into the 2024 U.S. Olympic trials, Noble was seen as a contender in the 200 backstroke event.
