= Norway at the 2025 Summer World University Games =

- Flag of Norway
- IOC code: NOR
- National federation: The Norwegian Association of University Sports

in Rhine-Ruhr, Germany 16 July 2025 – 27 July 2025
- Medals Ranked 33rd: Gold 1 Silver 1 Bronze 1 Total 3

Summer World University Games appearances
- 1959; 1961; 1963; 1965; 1967; 1970; 1973; 1975; 1977; 1979; 1981; 1983; 1985; 1987; 1989; 1991; 1993; 1995; 1997; 1999; 2001; 2003; 2005; 2007; 2009; 2011; 2013; 2015; 2017; 2019; 2021; 2025; 2027

Norway competed at the 2025 Summer World University Games in Rhine-Ruhr, Germany held from 16 to 27 July 2025. Norway took thirty-third place in the medal table with three medals.

== Medal summary ==
=== Medal by sports ===
| Rank | Sports | Gold | Silver | Bronze | Total |
|---|---|---|---|---|---|
| 1 | Athletics | 1 | 1 | 0 | 2 |
| 2 | Taekwondo | 0 | 0 | 1 | 1 |
| Totals (2 entries) | | 1 | 1 | 1 | 3 |

Source: rhineruhr2025.com

=== Medalists ===
| Medal | Name | Sport | Event | Date |
|---|---|---|---|---|
| Gold | Simen Guttormsen | Athletics | Men's pole vault | 27 July |
| Silver | Kitty Friele Faye | Athletics | Women's pole vault | 25 July |
| Bronze | Kristian Borgen | Taekwondo | Men -63kg | 22 July |
