= Lee Eun-ji (swimmer) =

South Korean swimmer (born 2006)

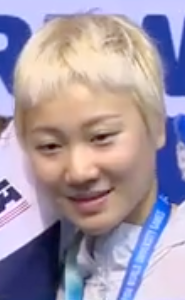
- At the 2025 Summer World University Games

Personal information
- Nationality: South Korean
- Born: July 23, 2006 (age 20) South Korea

Sport
- Sport: Swimming
- Event: Backstroke
Medal record
Women's swimming
Representing South Korea
Asian Games
Silver medal – second place	2022 Hangzhou	4×100 m medley relay
Bronze medal – third place	2022 Hangzhou	100 m backstroke
Bronze medal – third place	2022 Hangzhou	200 m backstroke
Bronze medal – third place	2022 Hangzhou	4×100 m mixed medley
Bronze medal – third place	2022 Hangzhou	4×200 m freestyle
Bronze medal – third place	2026 Aichi–Nagoya	4×100 m medley
Bronze medal – third place	2026 Aichi–Nagoya	4×100 m mixed medley
World University Games
Bronze medal – third place	2025 Rhine-Ruhr	100 m backstroke
Bronze medal – third place	2025 Rhine-Ruhr	200 m backstroke

Korean name
- Hangul: 이은지
- RR: I Eunji
- MR: I Ŭnji

Lee Eun-ji (Korean: 이은지; born July 23, 2006) is a South Korean swimmer.

== Career ==
In July 2021, she represented South Korea at the 2020 Summer Olympics held in Tokyo, Japan. She competed in 100m backstroke and 200m backstroke events. In both events, she did not advance to compete in the semifinal.
