= Teagan O'Dell =

American swimmer (born 2006)

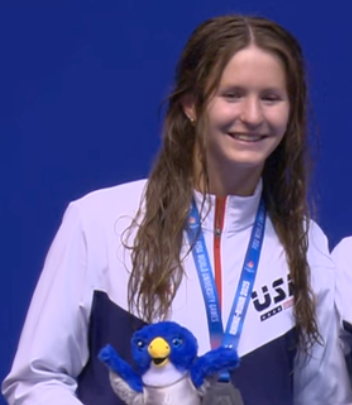
- At the 2025 Summer World University Games

Personal information
- National team: United States
- Born: November 28, 2006 (age 19) Orange, California, United States

Sport
- Sport: Swimming
- Strokes: Individual medley, backstroke, freestyle
- Club: Mission Viejo Nadadores
- Coach: Logan Redondo
Medal record
Women's swimming
Representing United States
Event	1st	2nd	3rd
World University Games	1	2	0
World Junior Championships	2	1	0
Total	3	3	0
World Junior Championships
Gold medal – first place	2023 Netanya	200 m backstroke
Gold medal – first place	2023 Netanya	4×100 m mixed medley
Silver medal – second place	2023 Netanya	4×100 m freestyle
World University Games
Gold medal – first place	2025 Rhine-Ruhr	4×100 m medley
Silver medal – second place	2025 Rhine-Ruhr	200 m medley
Silver medal – second place	2025 Rhine-Ruhr	400 m medley

Teagan O'Dell (born November 28, 2006) is an American competitive swimmer. She is the 200 meter backstroke champion in 2023 World Junior Championships, who also won gold in the 4×100 m mixed medley and a silver medal in the 4×100 m freestyle. At the 2022 Junior Pan Pacific Swimming Championships, she placed fourth in the 200 meter individual medley, won the B-final of the 200 meter backstroke, and placed second in the B-final of the 100 meter backstroke.

== Background ==
O'Dell attended Santa Margarita Catholic High School in Orange County, California for high school, where she competed as part of the school swim team. Her mother competed collegiately in swimming, her father was a quarterback for the football team at San Jose State University, and her three brothers are football players.

== Career ==
=== 2019–2021 ===
In 2019, at the Western Zone Age Group Swimming Championships in Oregon, O'Dell swam a personal best time of 2:18.69 in the 200 meter individual medley, which was the fastest time ever swum by a female American swimmer under 13 years of age, setting a new National Age Group record in the event for the girls 11–12 age group and breaking the former record set in 2008 by Missy Franklin. At the 2020 US Olympic Trials, held in Omaha, Nebraska in 2021 due to the COVID-19 pandemic, she was one of the youngest swimmers to compete at 14 years of age, and as one of the Wave I participants she tied for fourth-place in the B-final of the 100 meter backstroke and placed second in the B-final of the 200 meter backstroke with a 2:14.37.

Two months later, as a 14-year-old competing at the 2021 Speedo Summer Championships in Irvine, California, O'Dell swam a personal best time of 2:12.53 in the 200 meter individual medley, becoming the fastest female American swimmer ever in the event under 15 years of age, and breaking the former National Age Group record for the girls 13–14 age group of 2:12.73 set in 2009 by Missy Franklin. Earlier in the competition, she won the 200 meter backstroke with a personal best time of 2:09.57.

=== 2022 ===
At the 2022 USA Swimming International Team Trials, held in April in Greensboro, North Carolina, O'Dell placed eighth in the final of the 200 meter individual medley with a 2:17.62, tied for seventh in the C-final of the 100 meter freestyle with a 56.08, won the C-final of the 200 meter backstroke with a 2:12.38, placed fourth in the C-final of the 50 meter backstroke with a 28.84, and placed fifth in the C-final of the 100 meter backstroke with a 1:01.79. Based on her times and overall placings amongst junior swimmers at the trials, she was named to the 2022 Junior Pan Pacific Swimming Championships roster for the United States in the 200 meter individual medley. In May, she won California Division I State High School Championships titles for the 2021–2022 school year in the 100 yard backstroke, with a time of 52.27 seconds, and the 200 yard individual medley, with a 1:55.15. Gaining more competition experience leading up to the Championships, she competed at the senior 2022 US National Championships three months later, placing second in the C-final of the 400 meter individual medley with a 4:49.06 and won the D-final of the 200 meter freestyle with a 2:00.92.

==== 2022 Junior Pan Pacific Championships ====
Day one of the 2022 Junior Pan Pacific Swimming Championships, held at the Veterans Memorial Aquatic Center in Honolulu in August, she placed second in the B-final of in the 100 meter backstroke with a time of 1:01.61. The next day, she placed 20th in the 100 meter freestyle with a time of 56.36 seconds and the third day she won the B-final of the 200 meter backstroke with a time of 2:12.80. For the final day of competition, she swam a 2:15.96 in the preliminaries of the 200 meter individual medley and qualified for the final ranking fifth. In the final, she placed fourth with a time of 2:14.45, finishing just 0.09 seconds behind fellow American and bronze medalist Gracie Weyant.

==== 2022 Winter Junior National Championships ====
As a 16-year-old at the West edition of the 2022 Winter Junior US National Championships, held in December in Austin, Texas, O'Dell started off her individual events with a second-place finish in the 200 yard individual medley with a time of 1:55.61 and an eighth-place finish in the 50 yard freestyle with a time of 22.78 seconds on day two. In the finals session the following day, she placed fourth in the 200 yard freestyle with a personal best time of 1:43.94 before going on to place second in the 100 yard backstroke with a personal best time of 51.86 seconds. Day four of four, she placed second in the 200 yard backstroke with a personal best time of 1:51.00, which was 2.68 seconds behind the first-place finisher, 17-year-old Bella Sims, and 1.04 seconds ahead of the third-place finisher, fellow 16-year-old Katie Grimes, and won the 100 yard freestyle with a personal best time of 48.47 seconds, which was 0.21 seconds ahead of second-place finisher Rebecca Diaconescu and 0.29 seconds ahead of third-place finisher Claire Weinstein.

=== 2023 ===
At the 2023 TYR Pro Swim Series in Mission Viejo, California, O'Dell first placed fourth in the 200 meter backstroke with a 2:09.95, then placed sixth in the 100 meter backstroke with a 1:01.50, and concluded with a seventh-place finish in the 200 meter individual medley with a time of 2:16.39.

== International championships ==
Meet	100 freestyle	100 backstroke	200 backstroke	200 individual medley
PACJ 2022 (age: 15/16)	20th (56.36)	2nd (b) (1:01.61)	1st (b) (2:12.80)	4th (2:14.45)

== Personal best times ==
=== Long course meters (50 m pool) ===
Event	Time		Meet	Location	Date	Age	Notes	Ref
50 m freestyle	26.03		2023 MVN Fran Crippen Memorial Swim Meet of Champions	Mission Viejo, California	April 15, 2023	16		
100 m freestyle	55.58	h	2023 MVN Fran Crippen Memorial Swim Meet of Champions	Mission Viejo, California	April 14, 2023	16		
100 m backstroke	1:00.23		2023 MVN Fran Crippen Memorial Swim Meet of Champions	Mission Viejo, California	April 16, 2023	16		
200 m backstroke	2:09.57		2021 Speedo Summer Championships	Irvine, California	August 5, 2021	14		
200 m individual medley	2:12.53		2021 Speedo Summer Championships	Irvine, California	August 9, 2021	14	NAG	

Legend: NAG – National Age Group record (girls 13–14);
Records not set in finals: h – heat; sf – semifinal; r – relay 1st leg; rh – relay heat 1st leg; b – B final; † – en route to final mark; so – swim-off; tt – time trial

=== Short course yards (25 yd pool) ===
Event	Time	Meet	Location	Date	Age	Ref
100 yd freestyle	48.47	2022 Winter Junior US National Championships	Austin, Texas	December 10, 2022	16	
200 yd freestyle	1:43.94	2022 Winter Junior US National Championships	Austin, Texas	December 9, 2022	16	
500 yd freestyle	4:39.29	2022 Kevin B. Perry Senior Meet	La Mirada, California	November 4, 2022	16	
100 yd backstroke	51.86	2022 Winter Junior US National Championships	Austin, Texas	December 9, 2022	16	
200 yd backstroke	1:51.00	2022 Winter Junior US National Championships	Austin, Texas	December 10, 2022	16	
200 yd butterfly	1:57.51	2022 Road to Paris Senior Invitational	La Mirada, California	January 15, 2023	16	
200 yd individual medley	1:55.15	2022 CIF State Championships	Clovis, California	May 13, 2022	15	

== Records ==
=== National age group records (long course meters) ===
No.	Event	Time	Meet	Location	Date	Age	Age Group	Ref
1	200 m individual medley	2:18.69	2019 Western Zone Age Group Championships	Gresham, Oregon	August 8, 2019	12	11–12	
2	200 m individual medley (2)	2:12.53	2021 Speedo Summer Championships	Greensboro, North Carolina	August 7, 2021	14	13–14	

== Awards and honors ==
- Swimming World, High School Swimmer of the Year, Runner-up: 2022
- Orange County, Swimmer of the Year (girls): 2022
- United News Post, Orange County athlete of the week (girls): May 10, 2022
- Swimming World, Up & Comers: May 2021
