= Athletics at the 2025 Summer World University Games =

- Dates: 21–27 July 2025
- Host city: Bochum, Germany
- Venue: Lohrheidestadion (track and field events); Kemnader See (half marathon & race walk)
- Level: Senior
- Events: 51
- Participation: 1422 athletes from 86 nations

Athletics took place at the 2025 Summer World University Games from 21 to 27 July 2025 at the Lohrheidestadion in Bochum, Germany and Kemnader See.

== Medal table ==
* Host nation (Germany)

Rank	Nation	Gold	Silver	Bronze	Total
1	Japan	5	3	3	11
2	Australia	5	2	3	10
3	China	4	4	3	11
4	South Africa	4	2	4	10
5	Italy	4	1	4	9
6	Poland	3	3	1	7
7	Turkey	3	2	3	8
8	Germany*	2	3	4	9
8	Spain	2	3	4	9
10	Switzerland	2	3	1	6
11	Finland	2	1	2	5
12	France	2	1	0	3
13	Kenya	1	1	1	3
14	Czech Republic	1	1	0	2
14	Ireland	1	1	0	2
14	Norway	1	1	0	2
14	Sweden	1	1	0	2
18	Ukraine	1	0	2	3
19	South Korea	1	0	1	2
20	Belgium	1	0	0	1
20	Israel	1	0	0	1
20	Luxembourg	1	0	0	1
20	Portugal	1	0	0	1
20	Slovenia	1	0	0	1
20	Uzbekistan	1	0	0	1
26	United States	0	4	1	5
27	Hungary	0	3	3	6
28	Great Britain	0	3	2	5
28	India	0	3	2	5
30	Chinese Taipei	0	1	0	1
30	Croatia	0	1	0	1
30	Latvia	0	1	0	1
30	Thailand	0	1	0	1
30	Virgin Islands	0	1	0	1
35	Canada	0	0	2	2
36	Brazil	0	0	1	1
36	Colombia	0	0	1	1
36	Cyprus	0	0	1	1
36	New Zealand	0	0	1	1
36	Slovakia	0	0	1	1
Totals (40 entries)		51	51	51	153

== Medal summary ==
=== Men's events ===
Event	Gold		Silver		Bronze	
100 metres	Bayanda Walaza; South Africa	10.16	Puripol Boonson; Thailand	10.22	Hiroki Yanagita; Japan	10.23
200 metres	Bayanda Walaza; South Africa	20.63	Adrià Alfonso Medero; Spain	20.70	Lee Jae-seong; South Korea	20.75
400 metres	Lythe Pillay; South Africa	44.84 SB	Patrik Simon Enyingi; Hungary	45.41	Edoardo Scotti; Italy	45.61
800 metres	David Barroso; Spain	1:47.64	Maciej Wyderka; Poland	1:48.01	Mehmet Çelik; Turkey	1:48.07
1500 metres	Filip Ostrowski; Poland	3:46.10	Titouan Le Grix; France	3:46.32	Samuel Charig; Great Britain	3:46.62
5000 metres	Arthur Gervais; France	15:02.00	David Mullarkey; Great Britain	15:02.39	Collins Kiprotich; Kenya	15:02.47
10,000 metres	Brian Musau; Kenya	28:42.39 SB	David Mullarkey; Great Britain	28:43.44	Mario Priego; Spain	28:45.02 PB
110 metres hurdles	Tatsuki Abe; Japan	13.47	Ángel Díaz Rodríguez; Spain	13.59	Mondray Barnard; South Africa	13.59
400 metres hurdles	Berke Akçam; Turkey	49.29	Ryan Matulonis; United States	49.38 PB	Patrik Dömötör; Slovakia	49.45
3000 metres steeplechase	Ruben Querinjean; Luxembourg	8:18.46 GR	Alejandro Quijada; Spain	8:20.70 PB	István Palkovits; Hungary	8:35.05 PB
4 × 100 metres relay	South Korea (KOR); Lee Jae-seong; Kim Jeong-yun; Nwamadi Joel-jin; Seo Min-jun	38.50 SB	South Africa (RSA); Kyle Zinn; Retshidisitswe Mlenga; Mthi Mthimkulu; Bayanda Walaza	38.80 SB	India (IND); Lalu Bhoi; Animesh Kujur; Manikanta Hoblidhar; Dondapati Mrutyam Jayaram	38.89 SB
4 × 400 metres relay	Poland (POL); Daniel Sołtysiak; Marcin Karolewski; Wiktor Wróbel; Maksymilian Szwed	3:03.64 SB	United States (USA); Joey Gant; Xavier Donaldson; Ryan Matulonis; Jake Palermo	3:04.34 SB	Turkey (TUR); İlyas Çanakçı; Kubilay Ençü; Berke Akçam; İsmail Nezir	3:04.40 SB
Half marathon	Shinsaku Kudo; Japan	1:02:29 GR	Ramazan Baştuğ; Turkey	1:02:35 PB	Ryuto Uehara; Japan	1:02:39
Half marathon team	Japan (JPN); Shinsaku Kudo; Ryuto Uehara; Kento Baba	3:07:52	Turkey (TUR); Ramazan Baştuğ; Ayetullah Aslanhan; Azat Demirtaş	3:13:56	China (CHN); Ma Rui; Chen Zhongping; Wang Wenjie	3:17:45
20 kilometres walk	Andrea Cosi; Italy	1:19:48 GR	Atsuki Tsuchiya; Japan	1:20:08	Mykola Rushchak; Ukraine	1:20:10
20 kilometres walk team	Japan (JPN); Atsuki Tsuchiya; Keisuke Hara; Taisei Yoshizako	4:03:45	Australia (AUS); William Thompson; Timothy Fraser; Isaac Beacroft	4:04:50	China (CHN); Hu Xuanfei; Huang Peiyang; Sun Chaofan	4:09:07
High jump	Yonathan Kapitolnik; Israel	2.27 m	Fu Chao-hsuan; Chinese Taipei	2.25 m	Roman Anastasios; Australia	2.20 m =SB
Pole vault	Simen Guttormsen; Norway	5.75 m PB	Valters Kreišs; Latvia	5.65 m	Márton Böndör; Hungary	5.55 m
Long jump	Shu Heng; China	8.09 m	Koki Fujihara; Japan	8.00 m	Luka Herden; Germany	7.96 m
Triple jump	Connor Murphy; Australia	16.77 m SB	Praveen Chithravel; India	16.66 m	João Pedro de Azevedo; Brazil	16.35 m PB
Shot put	Aiden Smith; South Africa	20.25 m	Xing Jialiang; China	20.08 m	Riccardo Ferrara; Italy	19.91 m
Discus throw	Miká Sosna; Germany	64.26 m	Steven Richter; Germany	61.77 m	Mykhailo Brudin; Ukraine	60.71 m SB
Hammer throw	Mykhaylo Kokhan; Ukraine	77.10 m	Merlin Hummel; Germany	77.03 m	Giorgio Olivieri; Italy	73.78 m SB
Javelin throw	Simon Wieland; Switzerland	79.33 m SB	Nick Thumm; Germany	78.47 m	Topias Laine; Finland	75.96 m
Decathlon	Benjamin Guse; Australia	7918 pts PB	Aleksi Savolainen; Finland	7619 pts PB	Nino Portmann; Switzerland	7614 pts

=== Women's events ===
Event	Gold		Silver		Bronze	
100 metres	Georgia Harris; Australia	11.44	Magdalena Stefanowicz; Poland	11.49	Gabriella Marais; South Africa	11.51
200 metres	Vittoria Fontana; Italy	22.79 PB	Léonie Pointet; Switzerland	22.81 SB	Esperança Cladera; Spain	23.03
400 metres	Barbora Malíková; Czech Republic	51.52 SB	Veronika Drljacic; Croatia	51.66 PB	Alessandra Bonora; Italy	52.41
800 metres	Eloisa Coiro; Italy	1:59.84	Veronica Vancardo; Switzerland	2:00.08	Daniela García; Spain	2:00.12
1500 metres	Joceline Wind; Switzerland	4:19.96	Sarah Calvert; Great Britain	4:20.18	Kimberley May; New Zealand	4:20.39
5000 metres	Julia David-Smith; France	15:34.57 PB	Seema Kumari; India	15:35.86 SB	Emily Parker; Great Britain	15:36.12
10,000 metres	Klara Lukan; Slovenia	31:25.84 GR	Sarah Wanjiru; Kenya	31:41.80 PB	Alicia Berzosa; Spain	32:00.73 PB
100 metres hurdles	Saara Keskitalo; Finland	12.88 [.872]	Anna Tóth; Hungary	12.88 [.877]	Alicja Sielska; Poland	12.95
400 metres hurdles	Alice Muraro; Italy	54.60 PB	Michelle Smith; Virgin Islands	55.65	Sára Mátó; Hungary	55.92
3000 metres steeplechase	Ilona Mononen; Finland	9:31.86	Ankita Dhyani; India	9:31.99 PB	Adia Budde; Germany	9:33.34
4 × 100 metres relay	Australia (AUS); Georgia Harris; Kristie Edwards; Olivia Inkster; Jessica Milat	43.46 SB	Switzerland (SUI); Larissa Bertényi; Léonie Pointet; Iris Caligiuri; Soraya Becerra	43.47 SB	Germany (GER); Louise Wieland; Talea Prepens; Svenja Pfetsch; Jolina Ernst	43.60
4 × 400 metres relay	Germany (GER); Vivienne Morgenstern; Mona Mayer; Sabrina Heil; Yasmin Amaadacho	3:29.68 SB	Poland (POL); Kinga Gacka; Weronika Bartnowska; Paulina Kubis; Aleksandra Formella	3:30.21 SB	Canada (CAN); Paige Willems; Tyra Boug; Georgia Oland; Favour Okpali	3:34.16 SB
Half marathon	Ma Xiuzhen; China	1:12:48 PB	Makoto Tsuchiya; Japan	1:12:58	Mariya Noda; Japan	1:13:16
Half marathon team	Japan (JPN); Makoto Tsuchiya; Mariya Noda; Ayaka Maeda; Aoi Takahashi	3:39:32	China (CHN); Ma Xiuzhen; Li Yingcui; Wang Jiali	3:49:04	Turkey (TUR); Nursena Çeto; Dilek Öztürk; Ezgi Kaya	3:49:52
20 kilometres walk	Elizabeth McMillen; Australia	1:28:18 =GR	Ning Jinlin; China	1:28:32 PB	Ji Haiying; China	1:29:14
20 kilometres walk team	China (CHN); Ning Jinlin; Ji Haiying; Luo Yue	4:28:51	Australia (AUS); Elizabeth McMillen; Olivia Sandery; Alexandra Griffin; Allanah Pitcher; Rebecca Henderson	4:31:20	India (IND); Sejal Singh; Munita Prajapati; Mansi Negi; Shailini Choudhary; Mahima Choudhary	4:56:06
High jump	Una Stancev; Spain	1.91 m =PB	Asia Tavernini; Italy	1.89 m	Elena Kulichenko; Cyprus	1.87 m
Pole vault	Elien Vekemans; Belgium	4.60 m	Kitty Faye; Norway	4.50 m	Rachel Grenke; Canada	4.35 m PB
Long jump	Agate de Sousa; Portugal	6.70 m	Xiong Shiqi; China	6.68 m	Natalia Linares; Colombia	6.67 m PB
Triple jump	Sharifa Davronova; Uzbekistan	14.33 m PB	Linda Suchá; Czech Republic	13.89 m PB	Desleigh Owusu; Australia	13.86 m PB
Shot put	Axelina Johansson; Sweden	18.45 m	Abria Smith; United States	17.38 m	Colette Uys; South Africa	17.34 m
Discus throw	Özlem Becerek; Turkey	61.15 m SB	Caisa-Marie Lindfors; Sweden	58.80 m	Antonia Kinzel; Germany	58.43 m
Hammer throw	Zhao Jie; China	72.80 m	Nicola Tuthill; Ireland	69.98 m	Sara Killinen; Finland	67.80 m
Javelin throw	Esra Türkmen; Turkey	59.90 m PB	Evelyn Bliss; United States	57.37 m	Jana van Schalkwyk; South Africa	56.73 m
Heptathlon	Kate O'Connor; Ireland	6487 pts NR	Szabina Szűcs; Hungary	6081 pts PB	Emelia Surch; Australia	6068 pts PB

=== Mixed events ===
Event	Gold		Silver		Bronze	
4 × 400 metres relay	Poland (POL); Daniel Sołtysiak; Weronika Bartnowska; Marcin Karolewski; Aleksandra Formella	3:15.58 GR, SB	South Africa (RSA); Mthi Mthimkulu; Precious Molepo; Lythe Pillay; Marlie Viljoen	3:16.42 SB	United States (USA); Xavier Donaldson II; Zoey Goldstein; Jake Palermo; Charlee Crawford	3:17.91 SB

== Participanting NUSFs ==
A total of 1,342 athletes from 86 nations competed in the athletics events of the 2025 Summer World University Games.

- Albania (2)
- Argentina (4)
- Armenia (3)
- Australia (60)
- Austria (9)
- Azerbaijan (3)
- Bangladesh (4)
- Belgium (18)
- Bosnia and Herzegovina (3)
- Botswana (5)
- Brazil (10)
- Cambodia (3)
- Canada (50)
- Chile (13)
- China (18)
- Chinese Taipei (26)
- Colombia (20)
- Costa Rica (1)
- Croatia (9)
- Cyprus (7)
- Czech Republic (16)
- Denmark (12)
- Ecuador (20)
- Egypt (4)
- Estonia (24)
- Ethiopia (2)
- Finland (22)
- France (14)
- Germany (55) (host)
- Great Britain (55)
- Haiti (1)
- Honduras (2)
- Hong Kong (8)
- Hungary (51)
- India (93)
- Ireland (8)
- Israel (1)
- Italy (19)
- Japan (46)
- Kazakhstan (9)
- Kenya (9)
- Kyrgyzstan (2)
- Latvia (17)
- Lebanon (1)
- Luxembourg (4)
- Macau (6)
- Malaysia (23)
- Mali (2)
- Malta (7)
- Mexico (19)
- Moldova (3)
- Nepal (1)
- Netherlands (10)
- New Zealand (18)
- Nigeria (6)
- Norway (21)
- Oman (7)
- Pakistan (10)
- Philippines (2)
- Poland (49)
- Portugal (14)
- Romania (5)
- Saudi Arabia (7)
- Senegal (7)
- Singapore (6)
- Slovakia (16)
- Slovenia (20)
- South Africa (47)
- South Korea (23)
- Spain (19)
- Sri Lanka (11)
- Sweden (24)
- Switzerland (23)
- Tajikistan (3)
- Tanzania (2)
- Thailand (15)
- Turkey (40)
- Uganda (17)
- Ukraine (21)
- United Arab Emirates (1)
- United States (51)
- Uzbekistan (5)
- Vietnam (4)
- Virgin Islands (2)
- Zambia (10)
- Zimbabwe (2)

== See also ==
- FISU World University Games
- University and college sport
