= Julia Maik =

Polish swimmer

Personal information
- Nationality: Polish
- Born: 23 September 2003 (age 22)

Sport
- Sport: Swimming
- Strokes: freestyle, butterfly
Medal record
Women's swimming
Representing Poland
European Championships (SC)
Bronze medal – third place	2025 Lublin	4×50 m freestyle
Bronze medal – third place	2025 Lublin	4×50 m mixed medley
World University Games
Silver medal – second place	2025 Rhine-Ruhr	4×100 m medley
Silver medal – second place	2025 Rhine-Ruhr	4×100 m mixed medley

Julia Maik (born 23 September 2003) is a Polish swimmer specializing in freestyle and butterfly stroke, and a bronze medalist at the European Aquatics Championships.

== Career ==
In February 2024, at the 2024 World Aquatics Championships in Doha, she competed in the 4 × 100 meters freestyle relay, where her team finished in fourth place.

Four months later, during the 2024 European Aquatics Championships in Belgrade, she swam in the heats of the 4 × 100 meters freestyle relay. She was awarded a bronze medal when the Polish team finished third in the final.
