= Trinidad Ardiles =

Chilean swimmer (born 2003)

Personal information
- Nationality: Chilean
- Born: 10 May 2003 (age 23)

Sport
- Sport: Swimming

Trinidad Ardiles (born 10 May 2003) is a Chilean swimmer. She competed in the women's 200 metre backstroke event at the 2018 FINA World Swimming Championships (25 m), in Hangzhou, China.
