= Adela Piskorska =

Polish swimmer (born 2003)

Personal information
- Born: 16 November 2003 (age 22)

Sport
- Country: Poland
- Sport: Swimming
- Strokes: Backstroke
Medal record
Women's swimming
Representing Poland
European Championships (LC)
| Gold medal – first place | 2024 Belgrade | 100 m backstroke |
| Gold medal – first place | 2024 Belgrade | 4×100 m medley |
| Bronze medal – third place | 2024 Belgrade | 50 m backstroke |
World University Games
| Gold medal – first place | 2021 Chengdu | 50 m backstroke |
| Gold medal – first place | 2021 Chengdu | 100 m backstroke |
| Silver medal – second place | 2021 Chengdu | 4×100 m medley |
| Silver medal – second place | 2025 Rhine-Ruhr | 4×100 m medley |
| Silver medal – second place | 2025 Rhine-Ruhr | 4×100 m mixed medley |
European U23 Championships
| Gold medal – first place | 2023 Dublin | 100 m backstroke |
| Gold medal – first place | 2023 Dublin | 4×100 m mixed medley |
| Gold medal – first place | 2025 Šamorín | 100 m backstroke |
| Gold medal – first place | 2025 Šamorín | 4×100 m mixed medley |
| Silver medal – second place | 2023 Dublin | 50 m backstroke |
| Silver medal – second place | 2025 Šamorín | 50 m backstroke |
| Silver medal – second place | 2025 Šamorín | 200 m backstroke |

Adela Piskorska (born 16 November 2003) is a Polish swimmer specializing in backstroke, a gold medalist at the Summer Universiade (2023) and European champion (2024).

== Early life ==
Piskorska began her swimming career at the Torpeda Oleśnica club. In 2020, she joined UKS Shark Rudna and in 2022, she became a swimmer for AZS UMCS Lublin.

== Career ==
Piskorska has represented Poland at various international championships. In 2023, she won gold medals in the 50 meters and 100 meters backstroke and a silver medal in the 4 × 100 meters medley relay at the Summer Universiade held in 2023. In 2024, she became the European champion in the 100 meters backstroke and in the 4 × 100 meters medley relay (with Dominika Sztandera, Paulina Peda, and Kornelia Fiedkiewicz), and won a bronze medal in the 50 meters backstroke (she also finished 6th in the 200 meters backstroke at the same event).

She has also competed at:

- 2022 World Short Course Championships (eliminated in the heats in the 50 meters, 100 meters, and 200 meters backstroke)
- 2023 World Championships (eliminated in the heats in the 50 meters, 100 meters, and 200 meters backstroke; 10th place in the 4 × 100 meters medley relay)
- 2023 European Junior Championships (silver medals in the 100 meters backstroke, 4 × 100 meters medley relay, and 4 × 100 meters medley mixed relay, and a bronze medal in the 50 meters backstroke)
- 2024 World Championships (6th place in the 50 meters backstroke, 7th place in the 4 × 100 meters medley relay, and eliminated in the semi-finals in the 100 and 200 meters backstroke)

=== National Championships ===
At the Polish Championships in a 50-meter pool, Piskorska has won 9 medals:

- 2021: 50 meters backstroke: 3rd place
- 2023: 50 meters backstroke: 1st place, 100 meters backstroke: 1st place, 200 meters backstroke: 1st place, 4 × 100 meters medley relay: 2nd place
- 2023 (winter): 100 meters backstroke: 1st place
- 2024: 50 meters backstroke: 1st place, 100 meters backstroke: 1st place, 200 meters backstroke: 1st place

At the Polish Championships in a 25-meter pool, she has won 1 medal:

- 2021: 200 meters backstroke: 1st place

=== Records ===
Piskorska holds the Polish record in the 200 meters backstroke (short course) with a time of 2:04.64 (3 December 2021). She also set the Polish record in the 4 × 100 meters medley relay (long course) with a time of 4:00.23 (30 July 2023) and later improved it to 3:58.71 (23 June 2024).
