= Australia at the 2025 Summer World University Games =

- Flag of Australia
- IOC code: AUS
- National federation: UniSport Australia

in Rhine-Ruhr, Germany 16 July 2025 – 27 July 2025
- Competitors: 239 in 15 sports
- Flag bearer: Arnav Raja (fencing)
- Medals Ranked 11th: Gold 5 Silver 3 Bronze 4 Total 12

Summer World University Games appearances
- 1967; 1970; 1973; 1975; 1977; 1979; 1981; 1983; 1985; 1987; 1989; 1991; 1993; 1995; 1997; 1999; 2001; 2003; 2005; 2007; 2009; 2011; 2013; 2015; 2017; 2019; 2021; 2025; 2027

Australia competed at the 2025 Summer World University Games in Rhine-Ruhr, Germany held from 16 to 27 July 2025. Australia was represented by 239 athletes and took eleventh place in the medal table with 12 medals. Arnav Raja (fencing) became the flag bearer.

== Medal summary ==
=== Medal by sports ===
Rank	Sports	Gold	Silver	Bronze	Total
1	Athletics	5	2	3	10
2	Swimming	0	1	1	2
Totals (2 entries)		5	3	4	12

Source: rhineruhr2025.com

=== Medalists ===
Medal	Name	Sport	Event	Date
Gold	Georgia Harris	Athletics	Women's 100m	22 July
Gold	Connor Murphy	Athletics	Men's triple jump	26 July
Gold	Benjamin Guse	Athletics	Men's decathlon	26 July
Gold	Elizabeth McMillen	Athletics	Women's 20 km walk	27 July
Gold	Kristie Edwards; Georgia Harris; Olivia Inkster; Jessica Milat	Athletics	Women's 4 × 100 m relay	27 July
Silver	Josephine Crimmins	Swimming	Women's 50m butterfly	18 July
Silver	Alexandra Griffin; Elizabeth McMillen; Alannah Pitcher; Olivia Sandery	Athletics	Women's 20 km walk team	27 July
Silver	Isaac Beacroft; Corey Dickson; Tim Fraser; Will Thompson	Athletics	Men's 20 km walk team	27 July
Bronze	Josephine Crimmins	Swimming	Women's 100m butterfly	21 July
Bronze	Roman Anastasios	Athletics	Men's high jump	24 July
Bronze	Emelia Surch	Athletics	Women's heptathlon	24 July
Bronze	Desleigh Owusu	Athletics	Women's triple jump	27 July
