= Poland at the 2025 Summer World University Games =

- Flag of Poland
- IOC code: POL
- National federation: University Sports Association of Poland

in Rhine-Ruhr, Germany 16 July 2025 – 27 July 2025
- Competitors: 228 in 15 sports
- Flag bearers: Katarzyna Węgrzyn (table tennis); Łukasz Cimosz (badminton)
- Medals Ranked 10th: Gold 5 Silver 11 Bronze 8 Total 24

Summer World University Games appearances
- 1959; 1961; 1963; 1965; 1967; 1970; 1973; 1975; 1977; 1979; 1981; 1983; 1985; 1987; 1989; 1991; 1993; 1995; 1997; 1999; 2001; 2003; 2005; 2007; 2009; 2011; 2013; 2015; 2017; 2019; 2021; 2025; 2027

Poland will compete at the 2025 Summer World University Games, which will be held from 16 July to 27 July 2025 in Rhine-Ruhr region, Germany. Katarzyna Węgrzyn (table tennis) and Łukasz Cimosz (badminton) became the flag bearers.

== Medal summary ==
=== Medal by sports ===
Rank	Sports	Gold	Silver	Bronze	Total
1	Athletics	3	3	1	7
2	Judo	1	0	0	1
2	Volleyball	1	0	0	1
4	Swimming	0	4	3	7
5	Fencing	0	2	0	2
6	Taekwondo	0	1	2	3
7	Rowing	0	1	1	2
8	Archery	0	0	1	1
Totals (8 entries)		5	11	8	24

Source: rhineruhr2025.com

=== Medalists ===
Medal	Name	Sport	Event	Date
Gold	Weronika Bartnowska; Daniel Sołtysiak; Patryk Grzegorzewicz; Wiktor Wróbel; Martyna Guzowska; Kinga Gacka; Marcin Karolewski; Aleksandra Formella	Athletics	Mixed 4 x 400m relay	24 July
Gold	Filip Ostrowski	Athletics	Men's 1500m	24 July
Gold	Seweryn Lipiński; Daniel Popiela; Dawid Pawlun; Aliaksei Nasevich; Remigiusz Kapica; Piotr Śliwka / Maciej Czyrek; Kajetan Kubicki; Jordan Zaleszczyk; Michał Gierżot; Marcel Hendzelewski; Antoni Kwasigroch	Volleyball	Men	24 July
Gold	Michał Jędrzejewski	Judo	Men -100 kg	25 July
Gold	Maksymilian Szwed; Marcin Karolewski; Daniel Sołtysiak; Wiktor Wróbel; Patryk Grzegorzewicz	Athletics	Men's 4 x 400m relay	27 July
Silver	Dawid Wiekiera	Swimming	Men's 100m breaststroke	18 July
Silver	Jan Nowak	Fencing	Men's foil individual	19 July
Silver	Adela Piskorska; Dawid Wiekiera; Adrian Jaśkiewicz; Julia Maik; Dominik Dudys; Barbara Mazurkiewicz; Wiktoria Piotrowska; Aleksander Sienkiewicz	Swimming	Mixed 4x100m medley relay	19 July
Silver	Magdalena Stefanowicz	Athletics	Women's 100m	22 July
Silver	Jan Nowak; Szymon Pacholczyk; Mateusz Kwiatkowski; Maciej Bem	Fencing	Men's foil team	22 July
Silver	Szymon Piątkowski	Taekwondo	Men -87kg	22 July
Silver	Barbara Mazurkiewicz	Swimming	Women's 100m breaststroke	23 July
Silver	Adela Piskorska; Barbara Mazurkiewicz; Wiktoria Piotrowska; Julia Maik; Natalia Janiszewska; Gabriela Król; Aleksandra Polańska	Swimming	Women's 4x100m medley relay	23 July
Silver	Weronika Bartnowska; Martyna Guzowska; Aleksandra Formella; Kinga Gacka; Edyta Bielska; Julia Słocka; Paulina Kubis	Athletics	Women's 4 x 400m relay	27 July
Silver	Maciej Wyderka	Athletics	Men's 800m	27 July
Silver	Bartłomiej Sopoński; Oskar Streich; Magdalena Ładna; Kazimir Kujda; Szymon Tomiak; Jakub Sobański; Tomasz Lewicki; Emilian Jackowiak; Jerzy Kaczmarek	Rowing	Men's eight	27 July
Bronze	Barbara Mazurkiewicz	Swimming	Women's 50m breaststroke	19 July
Bronze	Nikol Lisowska	Taekwondo	Women -57kg	19 July
Bronze	Dawid Wiekiera	Swimming	Men's 200m breaststroke	20 July
Bronze	Dagmara Haremza	Taekwondo	Women +73kg	21 July
Bronze	Dawid Wiekiera	Swimming	Men's 50m breaststroke	22 July
Bronze	Alicja Sielska	Athletics	Women's 100m hurdles	25 July
Bronze	Przemysław Konecki	Archery	Men's individual compound	26 July
Bronze	Wiktoria Kalinowska; Barbara Jęchorek	Rowing	Women's double sculls	27 July
