= Portugal at the 2025 Summer World University Games =

- Flag of Portugal
- IOC code: POR
- National federation: Portuguese Academic Federation of University Sport

in Rhine-Ruhr, Germany 16 July 2025 – 27 July 2025
- Competitors: 82 in 11 sports
- Medals Ranked 28th: Gold 2 Silver 1 Bronze 2 Total 5

Summer World University Games appearances
- 1959; 1961; 1963; 1965; 1967; 1970; 1973; 1975; 1977; 1979; 1981; 1983; 1985; 1987; 1989; 1991; 1993; 1995; 1997; 1999; 2001; 2003; 2005; 2007; 2009; 2011; 2013; 2015; 2017; 2019; 2021; 2025; 2027

Portugal competed at the 2025 Summer World University Games in Rhine-Ruhr, Germany held from 16 to 27 July 2025. Portugal was represented by 82 athletes and took twenty-eighth place in the medal table with 5 medals.

== Medal summary ==
=== Medal by sports ===
Rank	Sports	Gold	Silver	Bronze	Total
1	Swimming	1	1	0	2
2	Athletics	1	0	0	1
3	Judo	0	0	1	1
3	Tennis	0	0	1	1
Totals (4 entries)		2	1	2	5

Source: rhineruhr2025.com

=== Medalists ===
Medal	Name	Sport	Event	Date
Gold	Agate de Sousa	Athletics	Women's long jump	22 July
Gold	Francisca Martins	Swimming	Women's 400m freestyle	23 July
Silver	Francisca Martins	Swimming	Women's 800m freestyle	19 July
Bronze	Taís Pina	Judo	Women -70 kg	24 July
Bronze	Maria Garcia; Pedro Araújo	Tennis	Mixed doubles	24 July
