= United States at the 2025 Summer World University Games =

- Flag of the United States
- IOC code: USA

in Rhine-Ruhr, Germany 16 July 2025 – 27 July 2025
- Medals Ranked 3rd: Gold 28 Silver 27 Bronze 29 Total 84

Summer World University Games appearances
- 1965; 1967; 1970; 1973; 1975; 1977; 1979; 1981; 1983; 1985; 1987; 1989; 1991; 1993; 1995; 1997; 1999; 2001; 2003; 2005; 2007; 2009; 2011; 2013; 2015; 2017; 2019; 2021; 2025; 2027

United States competed at the 2025 Summer World University Games in Rhine-Ruhr, Germany held from 16 to 27 July 2025.

== Medal summary ==
=== Medal by sports ===
Rank	Sports	Gold	Silver	Bronze	Total
1	Swimming	27	12	11	50
2	Taekwondo	1	1	5	7
3	Diving	0	4	5	9
4	Athletics	0	4	1	5
5	Basketball	0	3	3	6
6	Water polo	0	2	0	2
7	Archery	0	1	0	1
8	Badminton	0	0	1	1
8	Beach volleyball	0	0	1	1
8	Gymnastics	0	0	1	1
8	Rowing	0	0	1	1
Totals (11 entries)		28	27	29	84

=== Medalists ===
Medal	Name	Sport	Event	Day
Gold	Eric Gun; Kaitlyn Reclusado	Taekwondo	Mixed pair Poomsae	17 July
Gold	Maxine Parker; Caroline Larsen; Julia Dennis / Isabel Ivey; Leah Hayes	Swimming	Women's 4 × 100 metre freestyle relay	18 July
Gold	Matthew King; Mitchell Schott; Owen West / David King; Camden Taylor	Swimming	Men's 4 × 100 metre freestyle relay	18 July
Gold	Leah Hayes	Swimming	Women's 400 metre individual medley	19 July
Gold	Leah Shackley	Swimming	Women's 200 metre backstroke	19 July
Gold	Emma Weber	Swimming	Women's 50 metre breaststroke	20 July
Gold	Jake Mitchell	Swimming	Men's 200 metre freestyle	20 July
Gold	Mila Nikanorov	Swimming	Women's 800 metre freestyle	20 July
Gold	William Modglin; Ben Delmar; Leah Shackley; Maxine Parker / David King; Nate Germonprez; Ella Welch; Isabel Ivey	Swimming	Mixed 4 × 100 metre medley relay	20 July
Gold	Kennedy Noble	Swimming	Women's 100 metre backstroke	21 July
Gold	Ben Delmar	Swimming	Men's 200 metre breaststroke	21 July
Gold	Jack Dahlgren	Swimming	Men's 200 metre butterfly	21 July
Gold	Leah Hayes; Cavan Gormsen; Lindsay Looney / Isabel Ivey; Michaela Mattes	Swimming	Women's 4 × 200 metre freestyle relay	21 July
Gold	Leah Shackley	Swimming	Women's 100 meter butterfly	22 July
Gold	Matthew King	Swimming	Men's 100 metre freestyle	22 July
Gold	Kate Hurst	Swimming	Women's 1500 metre freestyle	22 July
Gold	Matthew King; David King; Isabel Ivey; Maxine Parker / Owen West; Mitchell Schott; Caroline Larsen; Julia Dennis	Swimming	Mixed 4 × 100 metre freestyle relay	22 July
Gold	Cavan Gormsen	Swimming	Women's 200 metre freestyle	23 July
Gold	Leah Shackley	Swimming	Women's 50 metre backstroke	23 July
Gold	Leah Hayes	Swimming	Women's 200 metre individual medley	23 July
Gold	Baylor Nelson; Mitchell Schott; Jack Dahlgren / Jake Mitchell; Owen West; Ryan Erisman	Swimming	Men's 4 × 200 metre freestyle relay	23 July
Gold	Daniel Diehl	Swimming	Men's 200 metre backstroke	24 July
Gold	Emma Weber	Swimming	Women's 100 metre breaststroke	24 July
Gold	Matthew King	Swimming	Men's 50 metre freestyle	24 July
Gold	Tess Howley	Swimming	Women's 200 meter butterfly	24 July
Gold	Maxine Parker	Swimming	Women's 50 metre freestyle	24 July
Gold	Kennedy Noble; Emma Weber; Leah Shackley; Maxine Parker / Teagan O'Dell; Leah Hayes; Ella Welch; Isabel Ivey	Swimming	Women's 4 × 100 metre medley relay	24 July
Gold	William Modglin; Benjamin Delmar; Kamal Muhammad; Matt King / Owen McDonald; Nathaniel Germonprez; Matthew Klinge; Mitchel Schott	Swimming	Men's 4 × 100 metre medley relay	24 July
Silver	Lanie Gutch; Eliana Joyce	Diving	Women's synchronized 3 metre springboard	18 July
Silver	Teagan O'Dell	Swimming	Women's 400 metre individual medley	19 July
Silver	Kennedy Noble	Swimming	Women's 200 metre backstroke	19 July
Silver	Avery Brown; Jackson Hicke; Chandler Pigge; Nicholas Townsend	Basketball	Men's 3x3	20 July
Silver	Ethan Gun	Taekwondo	Men's 54 kg	20 July
Silver	Will Modglin	Swimming	Men's 100 metre backstroke	20 July
Silver	Mitchell Schott	Swimming	Men's 200 metre individual medley	20 July
Silver	Leah Shackley	Swimming	Women's 100 metre backstroke	21 July
Silver	Genevieve Jorgenson	Swimming	Women's 1500 metre freestyle	22 July
Silver	Luke Sitz; Joshua Sollenberger	Diving	Men's synchronized 3 metre springboard	23 July
Silver	Kaden Springfield; Sophia Mcafee	Diving	Mixed synchronized 10 metre platform	23 July
Silver	Eliana Joyce; Lanie Gutch; Kayleigh Clark; Taylor Fox / Sophia Mcafee; Avery Giese; Katerina Hoffman; Violet Williamson	Diving	Women's team classification	23 July
Silver	Abria Smith	Athletics	Women's shot put	23 July
Silver	Kennedy Noble	Swimming	Women's 50 metre backstroke	23 July
Silver	Teagan O'Dell	Swimming	Women's 200 metre individual medley	23 July
Silver	David King	Swimming	Men's 200 metre backstroke	24 July
Silver	Lindsay Looney	Swimming	Women's 200 metre butterfly	24 July
Silver	Julia Dennis	Swimming	Women's 50 metre freestyle	24 July
Silver	Ryan Matulonis	Athletics	Men's 400 metres hurdles	24 July
Silver	Cavan Gormsen	Swimming	Women's 400 metre freestyle	24 July
Silver	Leann Drake; Sydney Sullenberger; Danielle Woodie	Archery	Women's team compound	25 July
Silver	Jalynn Bristow; Kenadee Winfrey; Laci White; Denae Fritz; Kalysta Martin; Clara Blacklock; Sidney Love; Bailey Maupin; Jada Malone; Deyona Gaston	Basketball	Women's	25 July
Silver	Evelyn Bliss	Athletics	Women's javelin throw	26 July
Silver	Daniel Skillings; Jaylon White; Will Kuykendall; Drew Perry; Obi Agbim; Andre Igoudala II; Isaac Williams IV; Samson Aletan; Cameron Carr; Caden Powell	Basketball	Men's	26 July
Silver		Water polo	Men's tournament	26 July
Silver		Water polo	Women's tournament	26 July
Silver	Joey Gant; Xavier Donaldson; Ryan Matulonis; Jake Palermo	Athletics	Men's 4 × 400 metres relay	27 July
Bronze	Kaitlyn Reclusado	Taekwondo	Women's individual Poomsae	17 July
Bronze	Eric Gun	Taekwondo	Men's individual Poomsae	17 July
Bronze	Maxwell Miller; Eliana Joyce	Diving	Mixed synchronized 3 metre springboard	17 July
Bronze	Lanie Gutch; Kayleigh Clark	Diving	Women's synchronized 10 metre platform	17 July
Bronze	Kim Ga-hui; Lana Moraleda; Kaitlyn Reclusado	Taekwondo	Women's team Poomsae	18 July
Bronze	Luke Sitz	Diving	Men's 3 metre springboard	18 July
Bronze	Ryan Erisman	Swimming	Men's 400 metre freestyle	18 July
Bronze	Ben Delmar	Swimming	Men's 100 metre breaststroke	19 July
Bronze	Anesia Glascoe; Hannah Exline; Marlee Wagstaff; Elizabeth Becker	Basketball	Women's wheelchair 3x3	20 July
Bronze	Jack Pierre; Joseph Rafter; Ryan Fitzpatrick; Martrell Stevens	Basketball	Men's wheelchair 3x3	20 July
Bronze	Jaclyn Grisdale; Cecelia Collins; Lee Volker; Talya Brugler	Basketball	Women's 3x3	20 July
Bronze	Maxine Parker	Swimming	Women's 100 metre freestyle	20 July
Bronze	Daniel Diehl	Swimming	Men's 100 metre backstroke	20 July
Bronze	Baylor Nelson	Swimming	Men's 200 metre freestyle	20 July
Bronze	Hannah Keck	Taekwondo	Women's +73 kg	21 July
Bronze	Mason Laur	Swimming	Men's 200 metre butterfly	21 July
Bronze	Michael Rodriquez	Taekwondo	Men's 87 kg	22 July
Bronze	Daniel Diehl	Swimming	Men's 50 metre backstroke	22 July
Bronze	Avery Giese	Diving	Women's 1 metre springboard	23 July
Bronze	Maxwell Miller; Luke Sitz; Maxwell Weinrich; Andrew Bennett; Kaden Springfield / Dashiell Glasberg; Holden Higbie; Jacob Jones; Joshua Sollenberger	Diving	Men's team classification	23 July
Bronze	Isabel Ivey	Swimming	Women's 200 metre freestyle	23 July
Bronze	Ryan Erisman	Swimming	Men's 800 metre freestyle	23 July
Bronze	Xavier Donaldson II; Zoey Goldstein; Jake Palermo; Charlee Crawford	Athletics	Mixed 4 × 400 metres relay	24 July
Bronze	Michaela Mattes	Swimming	Women's 400 metre freestyle	24 July
Bronze	Baylor Nelson	Swimming	Men's 400 metre individual medley	24 July
Bronze	Ella Lin	Badminton	Women's singles	25 July
Bronze	Alexis Durish; Audrey Koenig	Beach volleyball	Women's tournament	26 July
Bronze	Patrick Hoopes	Gymnastics	Men's pommel horse	26 July
Bronze	Leah Faith Brannon; Taylor Rae Denger; Tiara Lynne Dye; Sabrina Gottschalk; Ashley Johnson; Katherine Myers; Lindsey Troftgruben; Ryleigh Alexis White; Lilian Grace Wilhelm	Rowing	Women's eight	27 July
