= Canada at the 2025 Summer World University Games =

- Flag of Canada
- IOC code: CAN
- National federation: U SPORTS Canada

in Rhine-Ruhr, Germany 16 July 2025 – 27 July 2025
- Competitors: 125 in 9 sports
- Flag bearers: Emma O'Croinin (swimming); Victor Lai (badminton)
- Medals Ranked 25th: Gold 2 Silver 1 Bronze 8 Total 11

Summer World University Games appearances
- 1959; 1961; 1963; 1965; 1967; 1970; 1973; 1975; 1977; 1979; 1981; 1983; 1985; 1987; 1989; 1991; 1993; 1995; 1997; 1999; 2001; 2003; 2005; 2007; 2009; 2011; 2013; 2015; 2017; 2019; 2021; 2025; 2027

Canada competed at the 2025 Summer World University Games in Rhine-Ruhr, Germany held from 16 to 27 July 2025. Canada was represented by 125 athletes and took twenty-fifth place in the medal table with 11 medals. Emma O'Croinin (swimming) and Victor Lai (badminton) became a flag bearers at the opening ceremony.

== Medal summary ==
=== Medal by sports ===
| Rank | Sports | Gold | Silver | Bronze | Total |
|---|---|---|---|---|---|
| 1 | Artistic gymnastics | 1 | 1 | 2 | 4 |
| 2 | Taekwondo | 1 | 0 | 2 | 3 |
| 3 | Athletics | 0 | 0 | 2 | 2 |
| 3 | Swimming | 0 | 0 | 2 | 2 |
| Totals (4 entries) | | 2 | 1 | 8 | 11 |

Source: rhineruhr2025.com

=== Medalists ===
| Medal | Name | Sport | Event | Date |
|---|---|---|---|---|
| Gold | Nithan Brindamohan | Taekwondo | Men -54 kg | 19 July |
| Gold | Félix Dolci | Artistic gymnastics | Men's horizontal bar | 26 July |
| Silver | Félix Dolci; Jayson Rampersad; Ioannis Chronopoulos; William Émard; Matteo Bardana | Artistic gymnastics | Men's team | 23 July |
| Bronze | Kai-Hsin Chang; Gordon Cheuk; Ethan So | Taekwondo | Men's team poomsae | 18 July |
| Bronze | Leonarda Andric | Taekwondo | Women -67 kg | 20 July |
| Bronze | Ashley McMillan | Swimming | Women's 200m individual medley | 22 July |
| Bronze | Shona Branton | Swimming | Women's 100m breaststroke | 23 July |
| Bronze | William Émard | Artistic gymnastics | Men's all-around | 25 July |
| Bronze | Rachel Grenke | Athletics | Women's pole vault | 25 July |
| Bronze | William Émard | Artistic gymnastics | Men's rings | 26 July |
| Bronze | Paige Willems; Tyra Boug; Favour Okpali; Shelby MacIsaac; Georgia Oland | Athletics | Women's 4 × 400 m relay | 27 July |
