= South Africa at the 2025 Summer World University Games =

- Flag of South Africa
- IOC code: RSA
- National federation: University Sport South Africa

in Rhine-Ruhr, Germany 16 July 2025 – 27 July 2025
- Competitors: 117 in 8 sports
- Flag bearer: Harry Saner (fencing)
- Medals Ranked 7th: Gold 6 Silver 5 Bronze 8 Total 19

Summer World University Games appearances
- 1959; 1961; 1963; 1965; 1967; 1970; 1973; 1975; 1977; 1979; 1981; 1983; 1985; 1987; 1989; 1991; 1993; 1995; 1997; 1999; 2001; 2003; 2005; 2007; 2009; 2011; 2013; 2015; 2017; 2019; 2021; 2025; 2027

South Africa competed at the 2025 Summer World University Games in Rhine-Ruhr, Germany held from 16 to 27 July 2025. South Africa was represented by 117 athletes and took seventh place in the medal table with 19 medals. Harry Saner (fencing) became the flag bearer.

== Medal summary ==
=== Medal by sports ===
Rank	Sports	Gold	Silver	Bronze	Total
1	Athletics	4	2	4	10
2	Swimming	2	2	4	8
3	Rowing	0	1	0	1
Totals (3 entries)		6	5	8	19

Source: rhineruhr2025.com

=== Medalists ===
Medal	Name	Sport	Event	Date
Gold	Pieter Coetze	Swimming	Men's 100m backstroke	19 July
Gold	Pieter Coetze	Swimming	Men's 50m backstroke	21 July
Gold	Bayanda Walaza	Athletics	Men's 100m	22 July
Gold	Lythe Pillay	Athletics	Men's 400m	23 July
Gold	Aiden Smith	Athletics	Men's shot put	24 July
Gold	Bayanda Walaza	Athletics	Men's 200m	24 July
Silver	Lara van Niekerk	Swimming	Women's 50m breaststroke	19 July
Silver	Pieter Coetze	Swimming	Men's 100m freestyle	21 July
Silver	Lythe Pillay; Mthi Mthimkulu; Precious Molepo; Wernich van Rensburg; Marlie Viljoen	Athletics	Mixed 4 × 400 m relay	24 July
Silver	Bayanda Walaza; Retshidisitswe Mlenga; Kyle Zinn; Mthi Mthimkulu	Athletics	Men's 4 × 100 m relay	27 July
Silver	Courtney Westley; Katherine Williams	Rowing	Women's pair	27 July
Bronze	Ruard Van Renen; Simone Moll; Guy Brooks; Olivia Nel; Michaela De Villiers	Swimming	Mixed 4 × 100 m medley relay	19 July
Bronze	Guy Brooks; Ruard Van Renen; Olivia Nel; Michaela De Villiers; Owethu Mahan; Georgia Nel	Swimming	Mixed 4 × 100 m freestyle relay	21 July
Bronze	Colette Uys	Athletics	Women's shot put	22 July
Bronze	Gabriella Marais	Athletics	Women's 100m	22 July
Bronze	Olivia Nel	Swimming	Women's 50m backstroke	22 July
Bronze	Olivia Nel	Swimming	Women's 50m freestyle	23 July
Bronze	Mondray Barnard	Athletics	Men's 110m hurdles	24 July
Bronze	Jana van Schalkwyk	Athletics	Women's javelin throw	26 July
