= Swimming at the 2025 Summer World University Games – Women's 200 metre individual medley =

Women's 200 metre individual medley at the 2025 Summer World University Games
- Venue: Schwimm- und Sprunghalle im Europasportpark
- Location: Berlin
- Dates: 21 July (heats and semifinals); 22 July (final)
- Competitors: 38 from 27 nations

Medalists
gold medal	Leah Hayes	United States
silver medal	Teagan O'Dell	United States
bronze medal	Ashley McMillan	Canada

The women's 200 metre individual medley at the 2025 Summer World University Games in Rhine-Ruhr, Germany was held from 21 to 22 July 2025. Leah Hayes from the United States won the gold medal, Teagan O'Dell from the United States took the silver medal and Ashley McMillan from Canada earned the bronze medal.

== Schedule ==
All times are Central European Time (UTC+1)

Date	Time	Round
21 July	10:14	Heats
21 July	19:53	Semifinals
22 July	20:01	Final

== Records ==
Prior to the competition, the world and Universiade records were as follows.

Category	Swimmer	Record	Date	Place	Event
World record	(Canada) Summer McIntosh	2:05.70	9 June 2025	Victoria, Canada	2025 Canadian Swimming Trials
Universiade record	(Japan) Yui Ohashi	2:10.03	23 August 2017	Taipei, Chinese Taipei	2017 Summer Universiade

== Results ==
=== Heats ===
All entered athletes competed across multiple seeded heats in the morning session. Swimmers with the top 16 fastest times advanced, regardless of which individual heat they swam.

Rank	Heat	Lane	Swimmer	Nation	Time	Notes
1	6	4	Leah Hayes	United States	2:10.71	Q
2	4	4	Teagan O'Dell	United States	2:13.10	Q
3	5	4	Ashley McMillan	Canada	2:14.86	Q
4	4	5	Rio Sato	Japan	2:15.60	Q
5	6	2	Lisa Nystrand	Sweden	2:16.34	Q
6	1	3	Ieva Maļuka	Latvia	2:16.41	Q
7	6	5	Ge Chutong	China	2:16.44	Q
8	5	6	Han An-chi	Chinese Taipei	2:16.53	Q
9	6	3	Chiara Della Corte	Italy	2:16.64	Q
10	4	2	Camille Tissandie	France	2:16.72	Q
11	6	7	Sudem Denizli	Turkey	2:16.73	Q
12	4	3	Hanna Bergman	Sweden	2:16.83	Q
13	4	6	Kim Herkle	Germany	2:17.03	Q
14	5	3	Iana Shakirova	Individual Neutral Athletes	2:17.04	Q
15	5	5	Anna Pirovano	Italy	2:17.80	Q
16	4	1	Dakota Tucker	South Africa	2:17.93	Q
17	5	7	Wang Wan-chen	Chinese Taipei	2:18.76	
18	5	1	Ng Lai Wa	Hong Kong	2:18.92	
19	6	8	Zeynep Şahin	Turkey	2:21.20	
20	5	8	Kate Meyer	South Africa	2:22.13	
21	3	5	Josefina Allport	Argentina	2:22.67	
22	4	8	Sabína Kupčová	Slovakia	2:22.70	
23	4	7	Natalia Janiszewska	Poland	2:23.15	
24	2	4	Cheang Weng Chi	Macau	2:23.98	
25	3	6	Fernanda Reyes	Chile	2:24.57	
26	1	5	Fatima Alkaramova	Azerbaijan	2:24.80	
26	3	1	Karolin Kotsar	Estonia	2:24.80	
28	6	1	Lam Hoi Kiu	Hong Kong	2:24.96	
29	3	2	Maria Erokhina	Cyprus	2:25.15	
30	3	3	Nicole Tay	Singapore	2:25.25	
31	2	5	Shrungi Bandekar	India	2:28.90	
32	2	3	Kimberly Uyaguari	Ecuador	2:30.98	
33	2	2	Jedidah Ajithjeswanthsingh	India	2:31.34	
34	3	8	Marie Toompuu	Estonia	2:33.01	
35	2	6	Florencia Orpis	Chile	2:36.07	
36	2	7	Karen Barros	Ecuador	2:38.76	
37	1	4	Christelle Feghali	Lebanon	2:51.72	
—	3	4	Paige van der Westhuizen	Zimbabwe	DNS	

=== Semifinals ===
The 16 advancing swimmers were split into two semifinal heats of 8 during the evening session. The swimmers recording the top 8 fastest times advanced to the final round.

Rank	Heat	Lane	Swimmer	Nation	Time	Notes
1	2	4	Leah Hayes	United States	2:10.01	Q
2	1	4	Teagan O'Dell	United States	2:11.79	Q
3	2	5	Ashley McMillan	Canada	2:13.08	Q
4	1	2	Camille Tissandie	France	2:14.07	Q
5	2	2	Chiara Della Corte	Italy	2:14.20	Q
6	1	1	Iana Shakirova	Individual Neutral Athletes	2:14.46	Q
7	2	6	Ge Chutong	China	2:14.62	Q
8	1	5	Rio Sato	Japan	2:14.71	Q
9	2	7	Sudem Denizli	Turkey	2:15.07	
10	1	7	Hanna Bergman	Sweden	2:15.23	
11	1	6	Han An-chi	Chinese Taipei	2:15.31	
12	2	3	Lisa Nystrand	Sweden	2:15.34	
13	2	8	Anna Pirovano	Italy	2:16.12	
14	1	3	Ieva Maļuka	Latvia	2:16.23	
15	2	1	Kim Herkle	Germany	2:17.24	
16	1	8	Dakota Tucker	South Africa	2:18.63	

=== Final ===
The fastest 8 swimmers competed in a single race to determine the gold, silver and bronze medalists.

Rank	Lane	Swimmer	Nation	Time	Notes
1st place, gold medalist(s)	4	Leah Hayes	United States	2:09.48	FR
2nd place, silver medalist(s)	5	Teagan O'Dell	United States	2:11.24	
3rd place, bronze medalist(s)	3	Ashley McMillan	Canada	2:12.63	
4	2	Chiara Della Corte	Italy	2:13.03	
5	7	Iana Shakirova	Individual Neutral Athletes	2:14.13	
6	6	Camille Tissandie	France	2:14.62	
7	8	Rio Sato	Japan	2:15.31	
8	1	Ge Chutong	China	2:17.28	
