= Swimming at the 2025 Summer World University Games – Women's 200 metre freestyle =

Women's 200 metre freestyle at the 2025 Summer World University Games
- Venue: Schwimm- und Sprunghalle im Europasportpark
- Location: Berlin
- Dates: 21 July (heats and semifinals); 22 July (final)
- Competitors: 47 from 33 nations

Medalists
gold medal	Cavan Gormsen	United States
silver medal	Ai Yanhan	China
bronze medal	Isabel Ivey	United States

The women's 200 metre freestyle at the 2025 Summer World University Games in Rhine-Ruhr, Germany was held from 21 to 22 July 2025. Cavan Gormsen from the United States won the gold medal, Ai Yanhan from China took the silver medal and Isabel Ivey from the United States earned the bronze medal.

== Schedule ==
All times are Central European Time (UTC+1)

Date	Time	Round
21 July	09:20	Heats
21 July	20:19	Semifinals
22 July	19:07	Final

== Records ==
Prior to the competition, the world and Universiade records were as follows.

Category	Swimmer	Record	Date	Place	Event
World record	(Australia) Ariarne Titmus	1:52.23	12 June 2024	Brisbane, Australia	2024 Australian Swimming Trials
Universiade record	(Hong Kong) Siobhán Haughey	1:56.71	25 August 2017	Taipei, Chinese Taipei	2017 Summer Universiade

== Results ==
=== Heats ===
All entered athletes competed across multiple seeded heats in the morning session. Swimmers with the top 16 fastest times advanced, regardless of which individual heat they swam.

Rank	Heat	Lane	Swimmer	Nation	Time	Notes
1	5	5	Isabel Ivey	United States	1:59.23	Q
2	7	3	Cavan Gormsen	United States	1:59.83	Q
3	5	4	Nicole Maier	Germany	2:00.17	Q
4	7	5	Julie Brousseau	Canada	2:00.33	Q
5	7	2	Giulia D'Innocenzo	Italy	2:00.59	Q
6	5	3	Francisca Martins	Portugal	2:00.67	Q
7	5	6	Sarah Dumont	Belgium	2:00.82	Q
8	6	4	Ai Yanhan	China	2:01.07	Q
9	6	3	Lucile Tessariol	France	2:01.08	Q
10	7	6	Ainhoa Campabadal	Spain	2:01.18	Q
11	6	2	Kanon Nagao	Japan	2:01.23	Q
12	6	1	Anna Fomina	Portugal	2:01.25	Q
13	7	4	Ge Chutong	China	2:01.31	Q
14	7	8	Hannah Robertson	South Africa	2:01.70	Q
15	7	7	Hanane Hironaka	Japan	2:01.79	Q
16	5	2	Noemi Lamberti	Italy	2:01.82	Q
17	6	7	Julia Pujadas	Spain	2:01.99	
18	6	8	Hannah Allen	Australia	2:02.06	
19	6	5	Emma O'Croinin	Canada	2:02.12	
20	5	7	Jemima Hall	Great Britain	2:02.26	
21	4	4	Aleksandra Polańska	Poland	2:02.76	
22	4	6	Maysa Raţiu	Romania	2:03.02	
23	4	5	Georgia Nel	South Africa	2:03.51	
24	5	1	Gaia Rasmussen	Switzerland	2:03.57	
25	5	8	Cornelia Pammer	Austria	2:03.59	
26	4	1	Laura Benková	Slovakia	2:05.19	
27	4	7	Manon Richard	Switzerland	2:05.36	
28	3	4	Paige van der Westhuizen	Zimbabwe	2:05.66	
29	4	2	Ashley Lim	Singapore	2:06.37	
30	4	3	Johanna Enkner	Austria	2:06.50	
31	7	1	Klaudia Tarasiewicz	Poland	2:06.57	
32	3	5	Bára Matošková	Czech Republic	2:07.20	
33	4	8	Chan Zi Yi	Singapore	2:07.67	
34	3	3	Tia Primc	Slovenia	2:07.73	
35	1	3	Fatima Alkaramova	Azerbaijan	2:08.70	
36	3	2	Bhavya Sachdeva	India	2:08.88	
37	3	1	Belen Lahoz	Argentina	2:09.13	
38	3	7	Anastasiya Zelinskaya	Uzbekistan	2:12.67	
39	2	5	Ashmitha Chandra	India	2:13.93	
40	3	8	Heleriin Haljaste	Estonia	2:14.32	
41	2	4	María Hincapié	Colombia	2:17.13	
42	2	2	Kristiāna Maskava-Pudāne	Latvia	2:18.38	
43	2	3	Paula Guevara	Ecuador	2:20.08	
44	1	5	Catalina Bustamante	Chile	2:21.11	
45	2	7	Victoria Okumu	Kenya	2:21.14	
46	2	6	Adriana Matute	Ecuador	2:28.43	
47	1	4	Moazma Hafeez	Pakistan	3:12.10	

=== Semifinals ===
The 16 advancing swimmers were split into two semifinal heats of 8 during the evening session. The swimmers recording the top 8 fastest times advanced to the final round. Ge Chutong withdrew from the semifinals and Julia Pujadas took her place.

Rank	Heat	Lane	Swimmer	Nation	Time	Notes
1	1	4	Cavan Gormsen	United States	1:58.22	Q
2	1	3	Francisca Martins	Portugal	1:58.49	Q
3	2	2	Lucile Tessariol	France	1:58.59	Q
3	1	6	Ai Yanhan	China	1:58.59	Q
5	1	5	Julie Brousseau	Canada	1:58.99	Q
6	2	3	Giulia D'Innocenzo	Italy	1:59.03	Q
7	2	5	Nicole Maier	Germany	1:59.22	Q
8	2	4	Isabel Ivey	United States	1:59.25	Q
9	1	2	Ainhoa Campabadal	Spain	1:59.43	
10	2	6	Sarah Dumont	Belgium	2:00.35	
11	2	7	Kanon Nagao	Japan	2:00.52	
12	1	8	Julia Pujadas	Spain	2:01.04	
13	2	1	Hannah Robertson	South Africa	2:01.24	
14	2	8	Noemi Lamberti	Italy	2:01.64	
15	1	7	Anna Fomina	Portugal	2:01.71	
16	1	1	Hanane Hironaka	Japan	2:01.83	

=== Final ===
The fastest 8 swimmers competed in a single race to determine the gold, silver and bronze medalists.

Rank	Lane	Swimmer	Nation	Time	Notes
1st place, gold medalist(s)	4	Cavan Viola Gormsen	United States	1:57.21	
2nd place, silver medalist(s)	3	Ai Yanhan	China	1:57.55	
3rd place, bronze medalist(s)	8	Isabel Ivey	United States	1:57.58	
4	5	Francisca Martins	Portugal	1:57.85	
5	6	Lucile Tessariol	France	1:58.39	
6	1	Nicole Maier	Germany	1:58.76	
7	2	Julie Brousseau	Canada	1:58.87	
8	7	Giulia D'Innocenzo	Italy	1:58.90	
