= Phillips Park (Aurora, Illinois) =

Municipal park in Aurora, Illinois, US

Coordinates: 41°44′11″N 88°17′40″W

Phillips Park is a municipal park in Aurora, Illinois, that includes Phillips Park Zoo. Comprising more than 325 acres, the park is managed by the Department of Parks and Recreation of the city of Aurora, and has co-owned areas with the Fox Valley Park District.

== History ==
Travis Phillips was a merchant in Aurora who had served as an alderman in the city and as its mayor. His deep love for the area became clear when it was learned after his passing that his will designated $24,000 from his estate be used to purchase land for a park that would be donated to Aurora. On November 21, 1899, the deed of purchase was signed for 60 acres. The land bought had been used as a picnic area for family outings as early as 1835 when it was known as Scharschug's Woods, and was built up as an entertain area in the early 1870s by the Aurora Sharp Shooter Society. At the time of its purchase it was called City Park, though most residents simply referred to it as Phillips Park, a name the city council officially gave it in 1902. The next major historical moment for the park was March 7, 1934, when over the years since then, several american mastodon bones including three skulls, three tusks, a lower jaw, a shoulder blade, three ribs, a femur, and several toe bones among others were dug up. Along with the mastodon bones, they also found the jaw bone and femur of a Castoroides ohioensis giant beaver, and the humerus and breast bones of a Trumpeter swan. Along with the remains of different plants such as bits of wood and the seed cones of both the Eastern hemlock, and the Black spruce. All of which were found during the Phillips Park Lake Excavation Project, sponsored by the Civil Works Administration during the Great Depression. Because of the discovery of bones the lake is still referred to as Mastodon Lake. The bones have traveled to different museums over the years, and when some of the mastodon bones were found, the Field Museum of Natural History made them an offer to trade a cast of there Megatherium skeleton, in exchange for the real mastodon bones, but they didn't take the deal. So now they are housed in the visitor center of the park that was built in 2003. Which was about one thousand feet away from where the bones were first found.

Improvements by the Works Progress Administration in 1938 included planting trees and shrubs, building fireplaces and animal pens, and new cages. The park has grown over the years adding new attractions, and still continues to be a place for family outings.

== Attractions ==
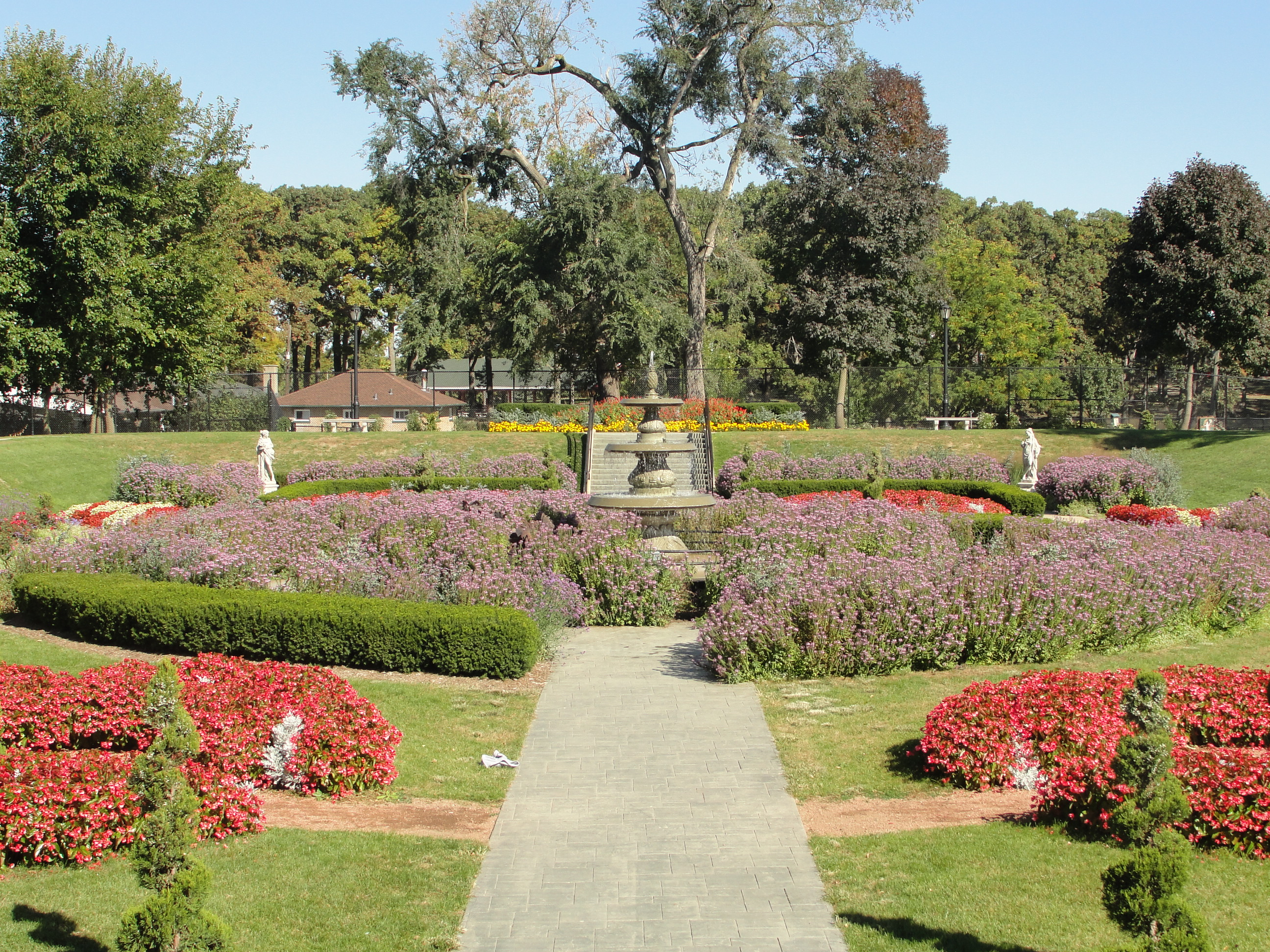
The Sunken Gardens in 2010

Aquatic Center: In a joint venture the water park was constructed in 1991 and included a tube slide, a body slide and two drop-off slides, a children's play pool with a waterfall and water cannons, as well as a tot slide. There is also a hot tub, a sand play area, a sand volleyball court and concessions.

Golf Course: The first golf course on Phillips Park grounds was constructed in the 1920s. Improvements and renovations have created the modern course now on the grounds. The course was redesigned by Greg Martin and reopened in 2001.

Phillips Park Zoo: Phillips Park Zoo was founded in 1915 and is still open daily with no admission.

Recreational Areas: Sites in the park included the waterfall, World War I cannons and numerous veteran related monuments. Among the amenities are a large state-of-the-art playground, a toddler's playground, picnic pavilions, sand volleyball courts, tennis courts, horseshoe courts, a jogging/bike path, fishing piers, an ice skating pond, and a sledding hill. Special events and activities are co-sponsored throughout the year with The Friends of Phillips Park.

Sunken Gardens: The original gardens were designed and developed by Ray Moses in the 1930s. In 2002 the gardens were rededicated to the east side of the zoo.

Visitor Center and Mastodon Gallery: The visitor center was built in 2003 to showcase the bones of the American Mastodon that were discovered in the 1934 excavation project.
