= Leah Hayes =

American swimmer (born 2005)

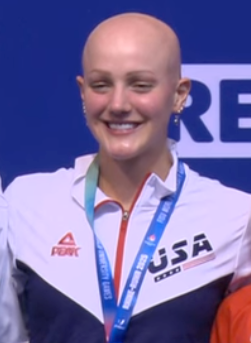
- At the 2025 Summer World University Games

Personal information
- Nationality: United States
- Born: October 21, 2005 (age 21) Sugar Grove, Illinois, U.S.
- Height: 5 ft 7 in (170 cm)

Sport
- Sport: Swimming
- Strokes: Individual medley
- Club: Fox Valley Park District Riptides
- Coach: Nancy Hooper
Medal record
Women's swimming
Representing United States
Event	1st	2nd	3rd
World Championships (LC)	0	0	1
World University Games	5	0	0
World Junior Championships	3	1	1
Total	8	1	2
World Championships (LC)
Bronze medal – third place	2022 Budapest	200 m medley
World Junior Championships
Gold medal – first place	2023 Netanya	200 m medley
Gold medal – first place	2023 Netanya	400 m medley
Gold medal – first place	2023 Netanya	4×200 m freestyle
Silver medal – second place	2023 Netanya	4×100 m freestyle
Bronze medal – third place	2023 Netanya	200 m freestyle
World University Games
Gold medal – first place	2025 Rhine-Ruhr	200 m medley
Gold medal – first place	2025 Rhine-Ruhr	400 m medley
Gold medal – first place	2025 Rhine-Ruhr	4×100 m freestyle
Gold medal – first place	2025 Rhine-Ruhr	4×100 m medley
Gold medal – first place	2025 Rhine-Ruhr	4×200 m freestyle

Leah Geneva Hayes (born October 21, 2005) is an American swimmer, currently swimming for the Illinois-based team Fox Valley Park District Riptides. She is a 200 m individual medley and 400 m individual medley Champion in 2023 World Junior Championships, also win gold medalist in 4 × 200 m freestyle, silver medalist in 4 × 100 m freestyle with bronze medalist in 200 m freestyle.

== Early life, swimming, and education ==
Hayes was born to parents Jill and Tim Hayes. At the age of six, Hayes was diagnosed with alopecia, a condition that causes hair loss. At the age of 10, Hayes would earn her first national age group record in the 200m freestyle.

Hayes attended Kaneland High School, and graduated in 2024. She committed to swim at the University of Virginia.

== Swimming career ==
=== 2018 ===
In 2018, Hayes was featured on Sports Illustrated Kids as the 2018 SportsKid of the Year.

=== 2019 ===
In 2019, it was announced that Hayes would start attempting national meets in order to get Olympic Time Trial cut times. In June, Hayes earned an Olympic Time Trials cut time at the 2019 Swim Pink A+ Invite in the 400m individual medley.

=== 2021 ===
In 2021, Hayes would swim in the 2020 United States Olympic trials in the 100m freestyle, the 200m individual medley, and the 400m individual medley. However, she would fail to qualify for the 2020 Summer Olympics in all three events.

=== 2022 ===
On April 26, it was announced that Hayes had suffered a stress fracture in her foot. However, she would still compete in the 2022 USA Swimming International Team Trials.

At Trials, Hayes managed to qualify for both the 200m and the 400m individual medley. While Hayes came fourth in the 400m behind Katie Grimes, Emma Weyant, and Hali Flickinger, Hayes was able to get herself into second place in the 200m, thus qualifying her for the USA Worlds team. and competed in the 2022 World Aquatics Championships in the women's 200m individual medley. Hayes, in an interview, was reportedly in shock at making the team, saying "To make the team, it's definitely quite a surprise... As we were getting our pictures taken and I was standing with all these incredible athletes, I was like, 'Oh my gosh.' I had a conversation with Katie Ledecky and with Lilly King. What in the world?"

Hayes was added to the roster of the 2022–2023 U.S. National Team by USA Swimming.

=== 2023 ===
At the 2023 World Aquatics Junior Swimming Championships in Netanya, Israel, Hayes set two new course records. The first was in the girls' 400m individual medley with a time of 4:36.84 and received a gold medal. Hayes is now ranked 6th all-time in the girls' 17-18 age group in the United States in the 400m individual medley. Hayes also set another course record with her gold medal win in the 200m individual medley with a time of 2:10.24. She later earned a second gold medal as part of the girls' 4x200m freestyle relay along with Addison Sauickie, Lynsey Bowen, and Madi Mintenko, with a time of 7:52.48.
