= Swimming at the 2025 Summer World University Games – Women's 400 metre individual medley =

Women's 400 metre individual medley at the 2025 Summer World University Games
- Venue: Schwimm- und Sprunghalle im Europasportpark
- Location: Berlin
- Dates: 18 July (heats and final)
- Competitors: 23 from 16 nations

Medalists
gold medal	Leah Hayes	United States
silver medal	Teagan O'Dell	United States
bronze medal	Ayami Suzuki	Japan

The women's 400 metre individual medley at the 2025 Summer World University Games in Rhine-Ruhr, Germany was held 18 July 2025. Leah Hayes from the United States won the gold medal, Teagan O'Dell from the United States took the silver medal and Ayami Suzuki from Japan earned the bronze medal.

== Schedule ==
All times are Central European Time (UTC+1)

Date	Time	Round
18 July	09:00	Heats
18 July	19:20	Final

== Records ==
Prior to the competition, the world and Universiade records were as follows.

Category	Swimmer	Record	Date	Place	Event
World record	(Canada) Summer McIntosh	4:23.65	11 June 2025	Victoria, Canada	2025 Canadian Swimming Trials
Universiade record	(Japan) Yui Ohashi	4:34.40	20 August 2017	Taipei, Chinese Taipei	2017 Summer Universiade

== Results ==
=== Heats ===
All entered athletes competed across multiple seeded heats in the morning session. Swimmers with the top 16 fastest times advanced, regardless of which individual heat they swam.

Rank	Heat	Lane	Swimmer	Nation	Time	Notes
1	3	4	Leah Hayes	United States	4:41.81	Q
2	2	5	Ayami Suzuki	Japan	4:44.12	Q
3	3	5	Teagan O'Dell	United States	4:44.78	Q
4	2	4	Anna Pirovano	Italy	4:46.64	Q
5	3	3	Rio Sato	Japan	4:46.79	Q
6	2	6	Lisa Nystrand	Sweden	4:48.30	Q
6	3	2	Camille Tissandie	France	4:48.30	Q
8	2	3	Claudia Di Passio	Italy	4:48.47	Q
9	3	7	Kim Herkle	Germany	4:49.01	
10	2	2	Applejean Gwinn	Chinese Taipei	4:49.12	
11	2	1	Dakota Tucker	South Africa	4:51.60	
12	2	7	Deniz Ertan	Turkey	4:53.39	
13	3	8	Ng Lai Wa	Hong Kong	4:53.65	
14	3	1	Zeynep Şahin	Turkey	4:55.37	
15	3	6	Ge Chutong	China	4:57.58	
16	2	8	Josefina Allport	Argentina	5:02.05	
17	1	7	Fatima Alkaramova	Azerbaijan	5:06.98	
18	1	4	Cheang Weng Chi	Macau	5:08.23	
19	1	3	Shrungi Bandekar	India	5:16.90	
20	1	5	Bhavya Sachdeva	India	5:17.62	
21	1	6	Kimberly Uyaguari	Ecuador	5:23.29	
—	1	1	Delfina Burgos	Argentina	DNS	
—	1	2	Paula Guevara	Ecuador	DNS	

=== Final ===
The fastest 8 swimmers competed in a single race to determine the gold, silver and bronze medalists.

Rank	Lane	Swimmer	Nation	Time	Notes
1st place, gold medalist(s)	4	Leah Hayes	United States	4:36.04	
2nd place, silver medalist(s)	3	Teagan O'Dell	United States	4:39.96	
3rd place, bronze medalist(s)	5	Ayami Suzuki	Japan	4:40.62	
4	2	Rio Sato	Japan	4:44.05	
5	7	Lisa Nystrand	Sweden	4:45.16	
6	6	Anna Pirovano	Italy	4:48.02	
7	8	Claudia Di Passio	Italy	4:49.29	
8	1	Camille Tissandie	France	4:52.68	
