= Swimming at the 2025 Summer World University Games – Women's 4 × 100 metre freestyle relay =

Women's 4 × 100 metre freestyle relay at the 2025 Summer World University Games
- Venue: Schwimm- und Sprunghalle im Europasportpark
- Location: Berlin
- Dates: 17 July (heats and final)
- Nations: 19

Medalists
gold medal	Maxine Parker; Caroline Larsen; Julia Dennis; Isabel Ivey; Leah Hayes	United States
silver medal	Liu Shuhan; Ge Chutong; Yu Liyan; Ai Yanhan	China
bronze medal	Giulia D'Innocenzo; Federica Toma; Viola Scotto di Carlo; Agata Ambler	Italy

The women's 4 × 100 metre freestyle relay at the 2025 Summer World University Games in Rhine-Ruhr, Germany was held 17 July 2025. United States won the gold medal, China took the silver medal and Italy earned the bronze medal.

== Schedule ==
All times are Central European Time (UTC+1)

Date	Time	Round
17 July	10:47	Heats
17 July	19:54	Final

== Records ==
Prior to the competition, the world and Universiade records were as follows.

Category	Team	Record	Date	Place	Event
World record	Australia	3:27.96	23 July 2023	Fukuoka, Japan	2023 World Championships
Universiade record	China	3:37.51	1 August 2023	Chengdu, China	2021 Summer World University Games

== Results ==
=== Heats ===
All entered teams competed across multiple seeded heats in the morning session. Teams with the top 8 fastest times advanced, regardless of which individual heat they swam.

Rank	Heat	Lane	Nation	Swimmers	Time	Notes
1	3	4	United States	Caroline Larsen (54.49); Julia Dennis (54.61); Leah Hayes (54.80); Isabel Ivey (53.80)	3:37.70	Q
2	2	4	Italy	Giulia D'Innocenzo (55.68); Agata Ambler (55.27); Federica Toma (54.67); Viola Scotto di Carlo (55.56)	3:41.18	Q
3	2	5	China	Ai Yanhan (55.30); Ge Chutong (55.47); Yu Liyan (56.26); Liu Shuhan (54.37)	3:41.40	Q
4	3	5	Japan	Sakura Ohshima (56.07); Ayu Mizoguchi (55.83); Rio Suzuki (55.72); Riko Sawano (55.58)	3:43.20	Q
5	2	6	South Africa	Olivia Nel (54.73); Georgia Nel (56.30); Michaela de Villiers (55.44); Hannah Robertson (57.18)	3:43.65	Q
6	3	3	Canada	Emma O'Croinin (55.96); Julie Brousseau (56.12); Ashley McMillan (56.00); Julia Strojnowska (57.16)	3:45.24	Q
7	2	2	Spain	Ainhoa Campabadal (56.48); Alba Herrero (55.90); Paula Juste (56.61); Julia Pujadas (56.52)	3:45.51	Q
8	2	7	Chinese Taipei	Liao Yu-fei (57.62); Chiu Yi-chen (57.92); Han An-chi (55.12); Liu Pei-yin (56.41)	3:47.07	Q
9	3	2	Switzerland	Manon Richard (56.59); Gaia Rasmussen (57.11); Angélique Brugger (56.39); Julia Ullmann (57.15)	3:47.24	
10	3	6	Poland	Adrianna Szwabińska (56.66); Gabriela Król (56.65); Wiktoria Piotrowska (58.70); Aleksandra Polańska (56.29)	3:48.30	
11	3	8	Slovakia	Zora Ripková (57.41); Sabína Kupčová (57.52); Laura Benková (58.06); Nina Vadovičová (59.26)	3:52.25	
12	1	4	Singapore	Ashley Lim (58.54); Yeo Chiok Sze (57.16); Chan Zi Yi (58.21); Kayley Goh (59.05)	3:52.96	
13	2	3	South Korea	Hong Jin-yeong (57.60); Kim Ye-eun (57.37); Kwon Woo-jin (1:00.48); Ju U-yeong (57.87)	3:53.32	
14	3	7	Turkey	Deniz Ertan (57.84); Hazal Özkan (58.35); Sudem Denizli (58.47); Zeynep Şahin (59.53)	3:54.19	
15	3	1	Estonia	Marie Toompuu (1:00.07); Heleriin Haljaste (1:01.05); Hanna-Marleen Mõtsnik (1:00.97); Karolin Kotsar (59.65)	4:01.74	
16	2	1	India	Latiesha Mandanna (1:01.42); Bhavya Sachdeva (1:01.89); Snigdha Ghosh (1:01.78); Nina Venkatesh (1:00.98)	4:06.07	
17	2	8	Argentina	Mia Martinicorena (1:02.51); Eliana Martini (1:05.67); Belen Lahoz (1:00.08); Aixa Recchioni (1:00.12)	4:08.38	
18	1	3	Chile	Fernanda Reyes (1:00.57); Antonia Cubillos (1:03.36); Florencia Orpis (1:04.19); Catalina Bustamante (1:02.82)	4:10.94	
19	1	5	Ecuador	Ana Matute (1:04.48); Kimberly Uyaguari (1:00.33); María Contreras (1:02.61); Paula Guevara (1:05.68)	4:13.10	

=== Final ===
The fastest 8 teams competed in a single race to determine the gold, silver and bronze medalists.

Rank	Lane	Nation	Swimmers	Time	Notes
1st place, gold medalist(s)	4	United States	Maxine Parker (54.28); Caroline Larsen (54.16); Julia Dennis (54.01); Isabel Ivey (53.76)	3:36.21	FR
2nd place, silver medalist(s)	3	China	Liu Shuhan (55.01); Ge Chutong (54.73); Yu Liyan (55.58); Ai Yanhan (53.38)	3:38.70	
3rd place, bronze medalist(s)	5	Italy	Giulia D'Innocenzo (55.43); Federica Toma (54.57); Viola Scotto di Carlo (54.96); Agata Ambler (54.90)	3:39.86	
4	6	Japan	Rio Suzuki (55.94); Riko Sawano (55.58); Sakura Ohshima (55.90); Ayu Mizoguchi (55.13)	3:42.55	
5	1	Spain	Ainhoa Campabadal (55.75); Alba Herrero (55.51); Julia Pujadas (55.97); Paula Juste (56.44)	3:43.67	
6	7	Canada	Emma O'Croinin (56.29); Julie Brousseau (55.92); Ashley McMillan (55.35); Julia Strojnowska (56.62)	3:44.18	
6	2	South Africa	Olivia Nel (54.96); Georgia Nel (56.43); Michaela de Villiers (55.38); Hannah Robertson (57.41)	3:44.18	
8	8	Chinese Taipei	Liu Pei-yin (56.81); Liao Yu-fei (56.61); Chiu Yi-chen (58.08); Han An-chi (55.27)	3:46.77	
