= Swimming at the 2025 Summer World University Games – Women's 4 × 200 metre freestyle relay =

Women's 4 × 200 metre freestyle relay at the 2025 Summer World University Games
- Venue: Schwimm- und Sprunghalle im Europasportpark
- Location: Berlin
- Dates: 20 July (heats and final)
- Nations: 14

Medalists
gold medal	Leah Hayes; Cavan Gormsen; Lindsay Looney; Isabel Ivey; Michaela Mattes	United States
silver medal	Ge Chutong; Yu Liyan; Liu Shuhan; Ai Yanhan	China
bronze medal	Ruka Takezawa; Rio Suzuki; Hanane Hironaka; Kanon Nagao; Sakura Ohshima; Riko Sawano	Japan

The women's 4 × 200 metre freestyle relay at the 2025 Summer World University Games in Rhine-Ruhr, Germany was held 20 July 2025. United States won the gold medal, China took the silver medal and Japan earned the bronze medal.

== Schedule ==
All times are Central European Time (UTC+1)

Date	Time	Round
20 July	11:01	Heats
20 July	20:44	Final

== Records ==
Prior to the competition, the world and Universiade records were as follows.

Category	Team	Record	Date	Place	Event
World record	Australia	7:37.50	27 July 2023	Fukuoka, Japan	2023 World Championships
Universiade record	United States	7:53.88	7 July 2015	Gwangju, South Korea	2015 Summer Universiade

== Results ==
=== Heats ===
All entered teams competed across multiple seeded heats in the morning session. Teams with the top 8 fastest times advanced, regardless of which individual heat they swam.

Rank	Heat	Lane	Nation	Swimmers	Time	Notes
1	2	4	United States	Leah Hayes (1:58.60); Lindsay Looney (2:00.73); Michaela Mattes (2:01.36); Cavan Gormsen (1:58.81)	7:59.50	Q
2	1	3	Spain	Alba Herrero (2:00.67); Julia Pujadas (2:00.38); Paula Juste (2:02.15); Ainhoa Campabadal (2:03.01)	8:06.21	Q
3	1	4	Canada	Julie Brousseau (1:59.88); Emma O'Croinin (2:00.37); Delia Lloyd (2:04.33); Julia Strojnowska (2:03.10)	8:07.68	Q
4	1	5	China	Ge Chutong (2:00.43); Yu Liyan (2:02.10); Liu Shuhan (2:03.32); Ai Yanhan (2:04.20)	8:10.05	Q
5	2	5	Japan	Hanane Hironaka (2:03.00); Rio Suzuki (2:00.39); Riko Sawano (2:05.92); Sakura Ohshima (2:02.18)	8:11.49	Q
6	2	6	Italy	Noemi Lamberti (2:01.55); Paola Borrelli (2:03.63); Francesca Furfaro (2:02.35); Claudia Di Passio (2:04.78)	8:12.31	Q
7	2	2	Switzerland	Julia Balthasar (2:03.70); Gaia Rasmussen (2:02.74); Amélie Bertschi (2:06.91); Manon Richard (2:04.83)	8:18.18	Q
8	1	6	South Africa	Hannah Robertson (2:03.04); Georgia Nel (2:04.09); Lise Coetzee (2:05.73); Hannah Pearse (2:07.26)	8:20.12	Q
9	2	3	South Korea	Hong Jin-yeong (2:08.44); Han Da-kyung (2:04.08); Lee Yun-jung (2:05.68); Hong Jung-hwa (2:07.17)	8:25.37	
10	1	2	Turkey	Sudem Denizli (2:05.92); Deniz Ertan (2:04.71); Zeynep Şahin (2:05.13); Hazal Özkan (2:11.46)	8:27.22	
11	1	1	Singapore	Chan Zi Yi (2:05.54); Ashley Lim (2:07.76); Elle Tay (2:13.11); Kayley Goh (2:11.78)	8:38.19	
12	2	7	Argentina	Josefina Allport (2:08.53); Belen Lahoz (2:10.76); Delfina Varela (2:23.19); Aixa Recchioni (2:13.38)	8:55.86	
13	2	1	Ecuador	María Contrera (2:17.19); Ana Matute (2:25.81); Paula Guevara (2:23.30); Kimberly Uyaguari (2:15.13)	9:21.43	
–	1	7	India		DNS	

=== Final ===
The fastest 8 teams competed in a single race to determine the gold, silver and bronze medalists.

Rank	Lane	Nation	Swimmers	Time	Notes
1st place, gold medalist(s)	4	United States	Leah Hayes (1:57.87); Cavan Gormsen (1:58.05); Lindsay Looney (1:59.41); Isabel Ivey (1:57.23)	7:52.56	FR
2nd place, silver medalist(s)	6	China	Ge Chutong (1:59.25); Yu Liyan (2:00.59); Liu Shuhan (1:59.45); Ai Yanhan (1:58.62)	7:57.91	
3rd place, bronze medalist(s)	2	Japan	Ruka Takezawa (1:58.86); Rio Suzuki (1:59.97); Hanane Hironaka (2:01.65); Kanon Nagao (1:59.51)	7:59.99	
4	7	Italy	Giulia D'Innocenzo (1:59.02); Noemi Lamberti (2:00.15); Federica Toma (2:02.23); Noemi Cesarano (1:59.42)	8:00.82	
5	3	Canada	Julie Brousseau (1:58.18); Emma O'Croinin (1:59.25); Delia Lloyd (2:02.66); Julia Strojnowska (2:01.44)	8:01.53	
6	5	Spain	Ainhoa Campabadal (1:59.30); Paula Juste (2:01.71); Alba Herrero (1:59.92); Julia Pujadas (2:00.70)	8:01.63	
7	8	South Africa	Hannah Robertson (2:02.87); Georgia Nel (2:02.48); Lise Coetzee (2:04.46); Hannah Pearse (2:03.42)	8:13.23	
8	1	Switzerland	Julia Balthasar (2:03.73); Gaia Rasmussen (2:03.40); Amélie Bertschi (2:07.17); Manon Richard (2:02.10)	8:16.40	
