= Ai Yanhan =

Chinese swimmer (born 2002)

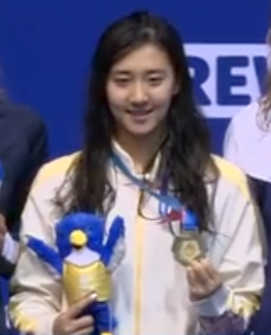
- At the 2025 Summer World University Games

Personal information
- National team: China
- Born: 7 February 2002 (age 24) Wuhan, China
- Height: 1.70 m (5 ft 7 in)
- Weight: 54 kg (119 lb)

Sport
- Sport: Swimming
- Strokes: Freestyle
Medal record
Women's swimming
Representing China
World Championships (LC)
Gold medal – first place	2024 Doha	4×200 m freestyle
Gold medal – first place	2024 Doha	4×100 m mixed freestyle
Silver medal – second place	2017 Budapest	4×200 m freestyle
Bronze medal – third place	2023 Fukuoka	4×100 m freestyle
Bronze medal – third place	2023 Fukuoka	4×200 m freestyle
World Championships (SC)
Gold medal – first place	2018 Hangzhou	4×200 m freestyle
Asian Games
Gold medal – first place	2018 Jakarta	4×200 m freestyle
Asian Championships
Gold medal – first place	2016 Tokyo	4×200 m freestyle
Silver medal – second place	2016 Tokyo	200 m freestyle
World University Games
Gold medal – first place	2025 Rhine-Ruhr	100 m freestyle
Silver medal – second place	2025 Rhine-Ruhr	200 m freestyle
Silver medal – second place	2025 Rhine-Ruhr	4×100 m freestyle
Silver medal – second place	2025 Rhine-Ruhr	4×200 m freestyle

Ai Yanhan (born 7 February 2002) is a Chinese competitive swimmer who specializes in freestyle.

She qualified for the 2016 Summer Olympics in Rio de Janeiro in the 200 meter freestyle. She swam the 8th time in the heats (1:56.77) and qualified for the semifinals, where she was eliminated with an 11th place.

== Personal bests ==
As of July 27, 2023

=== Long course (50-meter pool) ===
Event	Time	Meet	Date	Note(s)
50 m freestyle	25.20	2017 Chinese National Swimming Championships	April 8, 2017	
100 m freestyle	54.00	2021 Chinese National Games	September 24, 2021	
200 m freestyle	1:56.46	2016 Chinese National Swimming Championships	April 3, 2016	
400 m freestyle	4:07.77	1st Youth Swimming Championships	October 19, 2015	
800 m freestyle	8:52.34	Div.1 Age Group Swimming	June 8, 2016	
50 m butterfly	28.27	2023 Chinese National Swimming Championships	May 4, 2023	
100 m butterfly	59.64	2023 Chinese Spring National Swimming Championships	March 22, 2023	
200 m individual medley	2:17.86	2015 Chinese Summer National Swimming Championships	June 15, 2015	

=== Short course (25-meter pool) ===
Event	Time	Meet	Date	Note(s)
50 m freestyle	25.35	2018 FINA Swimming World Cup	November 2, 2018	
100 m freestyle	54.38	2017 FINA Swimming World Cup	November 11, 2017	
200 m freestyle	1:55.18	2016 FINA Swimming World Cup	September 30, 2016	
400 m freestyle	4:09.16	2016 FINA Swimming World Cup	October 1, 2016	

Key: NR = National Record; AS = Asian Record
