= Lison Nowaczyk =

French swimmer (born 2003)

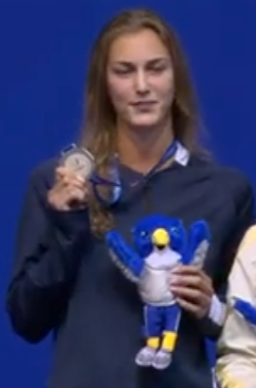
- At the 2025 Summer World University Games

Personal information
- Nationality: French
- Born: 27 January 2003 (age 23)

Sport
- Sport: Swimming
Medal record
Women's swimming
Representing France
European Championships (LC)
Bronze medal – third place	2020 Budapest	4×100 m freestyle
World University Games
Silver medal – second place	2025 Rhine-Ruhr	100 m freestyle

Lison Nowaczyk (born 27 January 2003) is a French swimmer. She competed in the women's 4 × 100 metre freestyle relay event at the 2020 European Aquatics Championships, in Budapest, Hungary, winning the bronze medal.
