= Swimming at the 2025 Summer World University Games – Women's 100 metre freestyle =

Women's 100 metre freestyle at the 2025 Summer World University Games
- Venue: Schwimm- und Sprunghalle im Europasportpark
- Location: Berlin
- Dates: 18 July (heats and semifinals); 19 July (final)
- Competitors: 60 from 41 nations

Medalists
gold medal	Ai Yanhan	China
silver medal	Lison Nowaczyk	France
bronze medal	Maxine Parker	United States

The women's 100 metre freestyle at the 2025 Summer World University Games in Rhine-Ruhr, Germany was held from 18 to 19 July 2025. Ai Yanhan from China won the gold medal, Lison Nowaczyk from France took the silver medal and Maxine Parker from the United States earned the bronze medal.

== Schedule ==
All times are Central European Time (UTC+1)

Date	Time	Round
18 July	09:59	Heats
18 July	19:11	Semifinals
19 July	19:00	Final

== Records ==
Prior to the competition, the world and Universiade records were as follows.

Category	Swimmer	Record	Date	Place	Event
World record	(Sweden) Sarah Sjöström	51.71	23 July 2017	Budapest, Hungary	2017 World Championships
Universiade record	(China) Zhang Yufei	53.34	3 August 2023	Chengdu, China	2021 Summer World University Games

== Results ==
=== Heats ===
All entered athletes competed across multiple seeded heats in the morning session. Swimmers with the top 16 fastest times advanced, regardless of which individual heat they swam.

Rank	Heat	Lane	Swimmer	Nation	Time	Notes
1	8	4	Maxine Parker	United States	54.99	Q
2	7	5	Lison Nowaczyk	France	55.03	Q
2	8	7	Olivia Nel	South Africa	55.03	Q
4	7	8	Han An-chi	Chinese Taipei	55.34	Q
5	8	3	Liu Shuhan	China	55.54	Q
6	6	8	Lucile Tessariol	France	55.58	Q
7	8	5	Julia Dennis	United States	55.65	Q
8	8	6	Federica Toma	Italy	55.66	Q
9	6	5	Ai Yanhan	China	55.75	Q
10	6	4	Iana Shakirova	Individual Neutral Athletes	55.76	Q
11	7	4	Kalia Antoniou	Cyprus	55.79	Q
12	7	2	Nicole Maier	Germany	55.98	Q
13	6	1	Jemima Hall	Great Britain	56.03	Q
13	7	3	Delia Lloyd	Canada	56.03	Q
15	4	4	Beatrix Tankó	Hungary	56.05	Q
16	8	8	Julia Maik	Poland	56.10	Q
17	8	2	Rio Suzuki	Japan	56.13	
18	7	1	Hanna Bergman	Sweden	56.20	
19	7	7	Alba Herrero	Spain	56.39	
20	5	4	Gabriela Król	Poland	56.43	
21	6	6	Ayu Mizoguchi	Japan	56.51	
22	8	1	Georgia Nel	South Africa	56.64	
23	6	2	Ainhoa Campabadal	Spain	56.79	
24	5	1	Angélique Brugger	Switzerland	56.85	
25	5	3	Liu Pei-yin	Chinese Taipei	56.98	
26	5	6	Julia Ullmann	Switzerland	57.17	
27	5	2	Cornelia Pammer	Austria	57.19	
28	4	2	Yeo Chiok Sze	Singapore	57.29	
29	5	7	Hong Jin-yeong	South Korea	57.31	
29	6	3	Viola Di Carlo	Italy	57.31	
31	3	4	Maysa Raţiu	Romania	57.37	
32	4	6	Paige van der Westhuizen	Zimbabwe	57.40	
33	6	7	Emma O'Croinin	Canada	57.54	
34	4	3	Ju U-yeong	South Korea	57.56	
35	4	7	Bára Matošková	Czech Republic	57.71	
36	4	5	Tia Primc	Slovenia	57.84	
37	5	8	Ashley Lim	Singapore	57.87	
38	3	5	Varsenik Manucharyan	Armenia	58.19	
39	4	1	Sabína Kupčová	Slovakia	58.22	
40	3	3	Fabienne Pavlik	Austria	58.24	
41	2	4	Nina Venkatesh	India	59.58	
42	1	3	Aixa Recchioni	Argentina	59.77	
43	3	7	Haley Sakbun	Cambodia	59.91	
44	3	6	Marie Toompuu	Estonia	1:00.25	
45	4	8	Fernanda Reyes	Chile	1:00.44	
46	3	1	Kuok Hei Cheng	Macau	1:00.49	
47	2	5	Latiesha Mandanna	India	1:00.54	
48	1	6	Eliane Saade	Lebanon	1:00.56	
49	3	2	Heleriin Haljaste	Estonia	1:00.95	
50	2	3	Anastasiya Zelinskaya	Uzbekistan	1:01.83	
51	3	8	Kristiāna Maskava-Pudāne	Latvia	1:02.36	
52	2	6	Delfina Varela	Argentina	1:02.99	
53	2	2	Adriana Matute	Ecuador	1:03.94	
54	1	7	Catalina Bustamante	Chile	1:04.13	
55	2	7	Seneshi Herath	Sri Lanka	1:04.89	
56	2	1	Paula Guevara	Ecuador	1:05.41	
57	1	2	Christelle Rouhana	Lebanon	1:07.55	
58	2	8	Altjin Amgalan	Mongolia	1:18.26	
59	1	4	Moazma Hafeez	Pakistan	1:24.29	
60	1	5	Dorah Nankunda	Uganda	1:32.92	

=== Semifinals ===
The 16 advancing swimmers were split into two semifinal heats of 8 during the evening session. The swimmers recording the top 8 fastest times advanced to the final round. Delia Lloyd withdrew from the semifinals and Rio Suzuki took her place.

Rank	Heat	Lane	Swimmer	Nation	Time	Notes
1	2	5	Lison Nowaczyk	France	54.42	Q
2	2	4	Maxine Parker	United States	54.53	Q
3	2	7	Kalia Antoniou	Cyprus	54.69	Q
4	1	4	Olivia Nel	South Africa	54.74	Q
5	2	3	Liu Shuhan	China	54.75	Q
6	2	6	Julia Dennis	United States	54.80	Q
7	2	2	Ai Yanhan	China	54.91	Q
8	1	2	Iana Shakirova	Individual Neutral Athletes	55.06	Q
9	1	3	Lucile Tessariol	France	55.07	
10	1	5	Han An-chi	Chinese Taipei	55.26	
11	1	1	Beatrix Tankó	Hungary	55.50	
12	1	7	Nicole Maier	Germany	55.53	
13	1	6	Federica Toma	Italy	55.71	
14	1	8	Rio Suzuki	Japan	55.91	
15	2	8	Julia Maik	Poland	56.00	
16	2	1	Jemima Hall	Great Britain	56.13	

=== Final ===
The fastest 8 swimmers competed in a single race to determine the gold, silver and bronze medalists.

Rank	Lane	Swimmer	Nation	Time	Notes
1st place, gold medalist(s)	1	Ai Yanhan	China	54.00	
2nd place, silver medalist(s)	4	Lison Nowaczyk	France	54.23	
3rd place, bronze medalist(s)	5	Maxine Parker	United States	54.30	
4	6	Olivia Nel	South Africa	54.32	
5	7	Julia Dennis	United States	54.36	
6	3	Kalia Antoniou	Cyprus	54.83	
7	2	Liu Shuhan	China	54.86	
8	8	Iana Shakirova	Individual Neutral Athletes	54.92	
