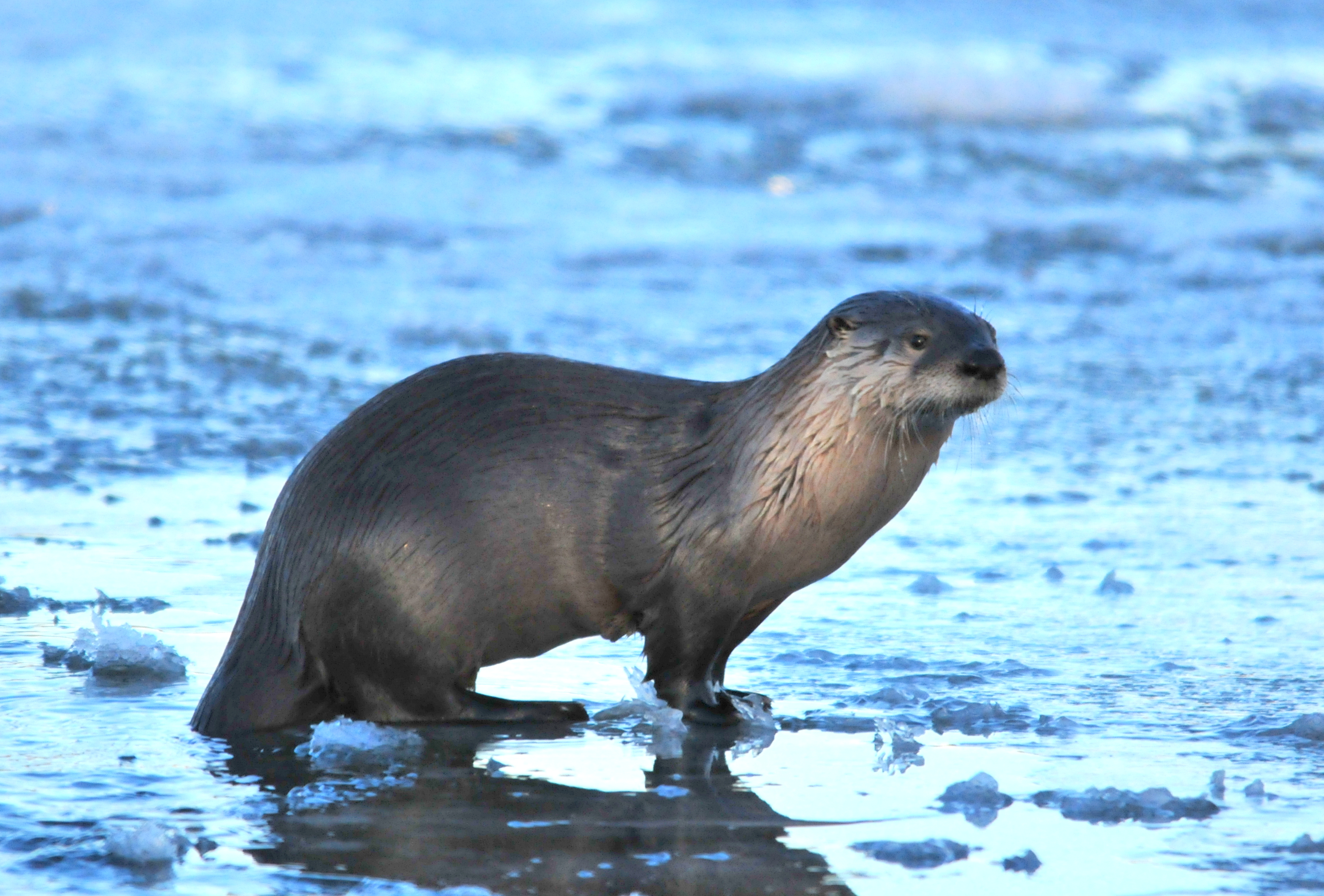

Conservation status
- Least Concern (IUCN 3.1)
- CITES Appendix II

Scientific classification
- Kingdom: Animalia
- Phylum: Chordata
- Class: Mammalia
- Order: Carnivora
- Family: Mustelidae
- Genus: Lontra
- Species: L. canadensis

Binomial name
- Lontra canadensis (Schreber, 1777)

Subspecies
- L. c. canadensis; L. c. kodiacensis; L. c. lataxina; L. c. mira; L. c. pacifica; L. c. periclyzomae; L. c. sonora
- Lontra canadensis distribution map

Synonyms
- Lutra canadensis

= North American river otter =

Species of semi-aquatic mammal

The North American river otter (Lontra canadensis), also known as the northern river otter and river otter, is a semiaquatic mammal that is endemic to the North American continent throughout most of Canada and along the coasts of the United States and its inland waterways. An adult North American river otter can weigh between 5 and 14 kilograms (11–31 lb). The river otter is protected and insulated by a thick, water-repellent coat of fur.

The North American river otter, a member of the subfamily Lutrinae in the weasel family (Mustelidae), is equally versatile in the water and on land. It establishes a burrow close to the water's edge in river, lake, swamp, coastal shoreline, tidal flat, or estuary ecosystems. The den typically has many tunnel openings, one of which generally allows the otter to enter and exit the body of water. Females give birth in these burrows, producing litters of one to six young.

North American river otters, like most predators, prey upon the most readily accessible species. Fish is a favored food among the otters, but they also consume various amphibians (such as salamanders and frogs), freshwater clams, mussels, snails, small turtles, and crayfish. The most common fish consumed are perch, suckers, and catfish. Occasional reports also show the river otter eating other small animals, such as mice, squirrels, birds, and even dogs that they have attacked and drowned.

The range of the North American river otter has been significantly reduced by habitat loss, beginning with the European colonization of the Americas. In some regions, though, their population is controlled to allow the trapping and harvesting of otters for their fur. North American river otters are very susceptible to the effects of environmental pollution, which is a likely factor in the continued decline of their numbers. A number of reintroduction projects have been initiated to help halt the reduction in their overall population.

== Taxonomy and evolution ==
The North American river otter was first described by German naturalist Johann Christian Daniel von Schreber in 1777. The mammal was identified as a species of otter and has a variety of common names, including North American river otter, northern river otter, common otter, and simply river otter. Other documented common names are American otter, Canada otter, Canadian otter, fish otter, land otter, nearctic river otter, and Prince of Wales otter. The North American river otter was first classified in the genus Lutra, which was the early European name (from Latin), and the specific epithet canadensis means "of Canada".

In a new classification, the species is called Lontra canadensis, where the genus Lontra includes all the New World river otters.

Molecular biological techniques have been used to determine when the river otter and the giant otter (Pteronura brasiliensis) of South America diverged. These analyses suggest they diverged in the Miocene epoch 23.03 to 5.33 million years ago (Mya), which is "much earlier" than indicated in the fossil record. Fossils of a giant otter dating back 3.5 Mya (during the Pliocene) have been found in the US Midwest; however, fossils of the modern river otter did not appear in North America until about 1.9 Mya. The New World river otters originated from the Old World river otters following a migration across the Bering Land Bridge, which existed off and on between 1.8 million and 10,000 years ago. The otters migrated to North America and southwards again across the Panamanian Land Bridge, which formed 3 Mya.

=== Subspecies ===
Listed alphabetically:

- L. c. canadensis (Schreber, 1777) – (eastern Canada, U.S., Newfoundland)
- L. c. kodiacensis (Goldman, 1935) – (Kodiak Island, Alaska)
- L. c. lataxina (Cuvier, 1823) – (U.S.)
- L. c. mira (Goldman, 1935) – (Alaska, British Columbia)
- L. c. pacifica (J. A. Allen, 1898) – (Alaska, Canada, northern U.S., south to central California, northern Nevada, and northeastern Utah)
- L. c. periclyzomae (Elliot, 1905) – (Queen Charlotte Islands, British Columbia)
- L. c. sonora (Rhoads, 1898) – (U.S., Mexico)

== Description ==
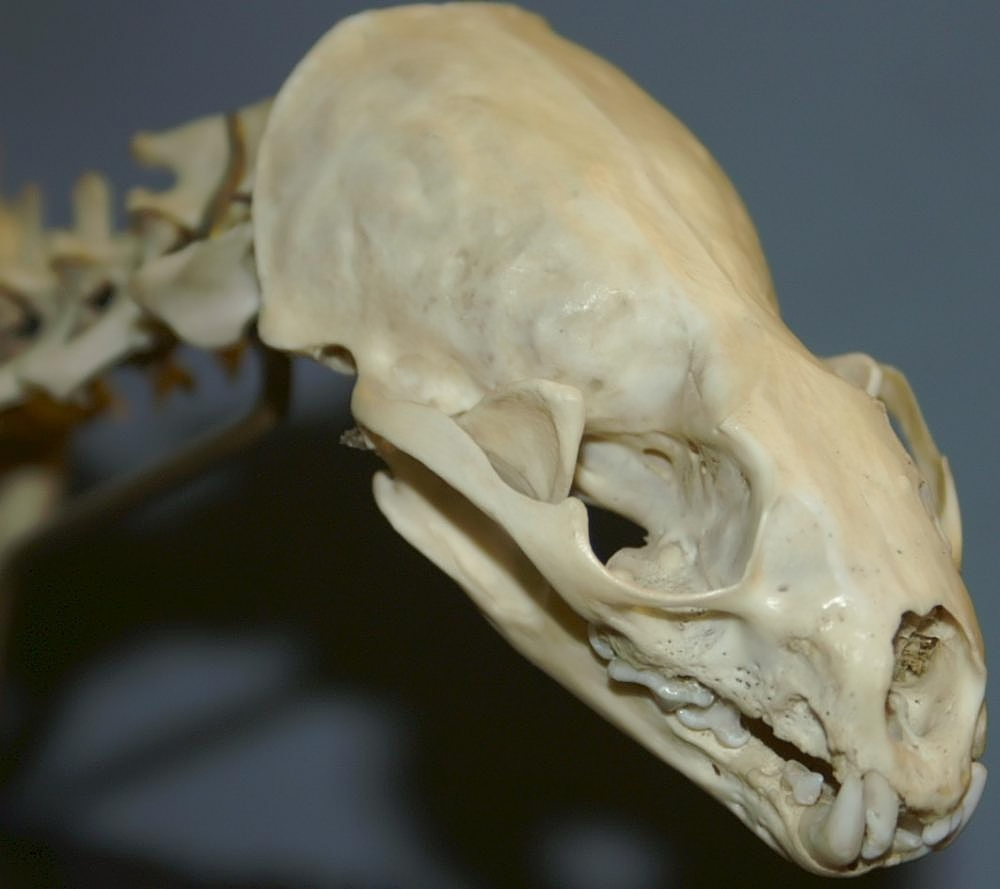
Skull of a North American river otter

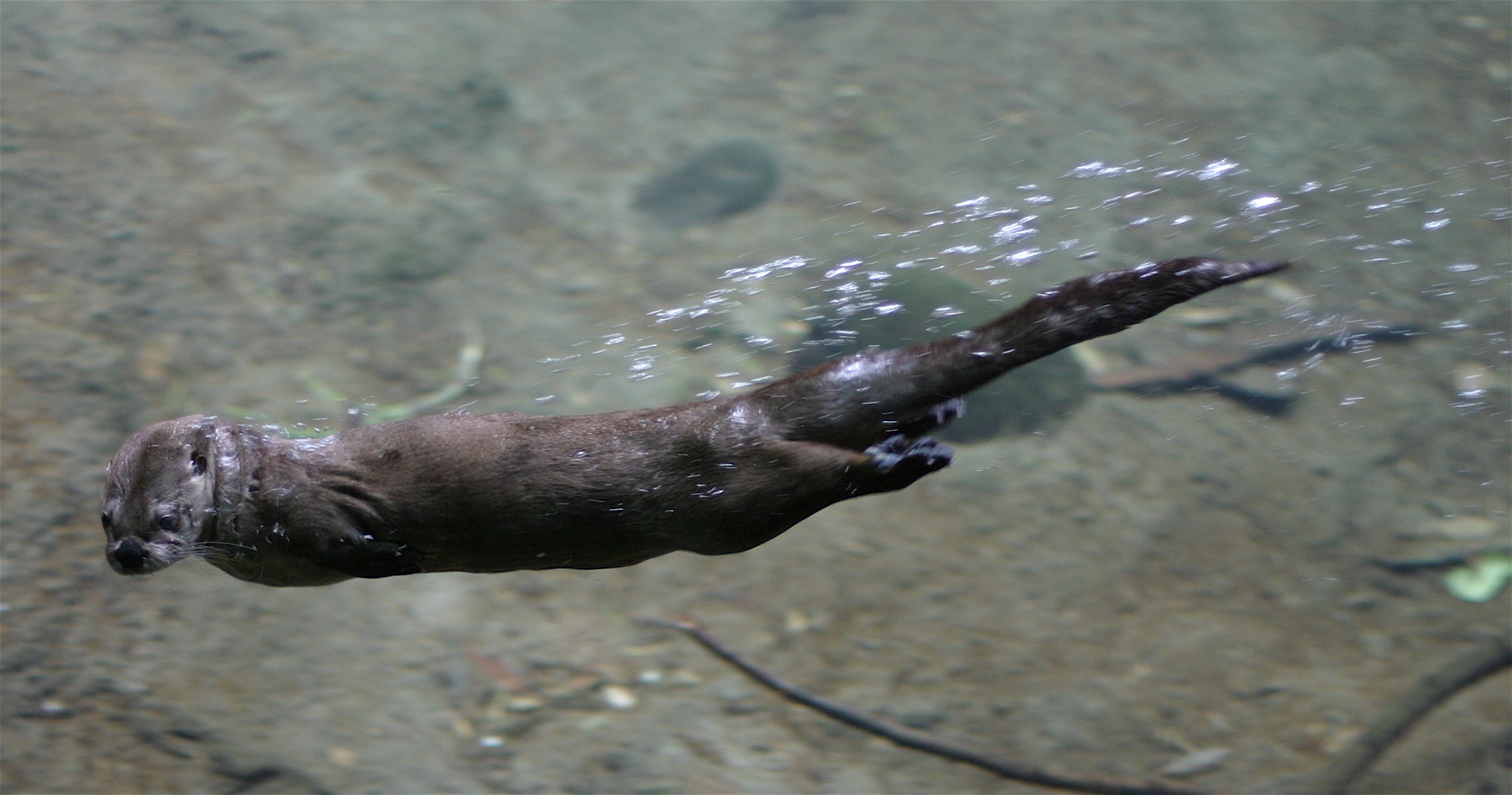
The North American river otter's streamlined shape allows it to glide through the water.

The North American river otter has long and thin whiskers that are used to detect prey in dark waters. An average adult male weighs about 11.3 kilograms (25 lb) against the female's average of 8.3 kg (18 lb). Its body length ranges from 66 to 107 cm (26–42 in). About one-third of the animal's total length consists of a long, tapered tail. Tail lengths range from 30 to 50 cm (12–20 in). Large males can exceed a weight of 15 kg (33 lb). It differs from the Eurasian otter by its longer neck, narrower visage, the smaller space between the ears, and shorter tail.

Males and female river otters show different nonsexual physical characteristics, with males typically being larger.

North American river otters can live 21–25 years in captivity, or 8–13 years in the wild.

=== Form and function ===
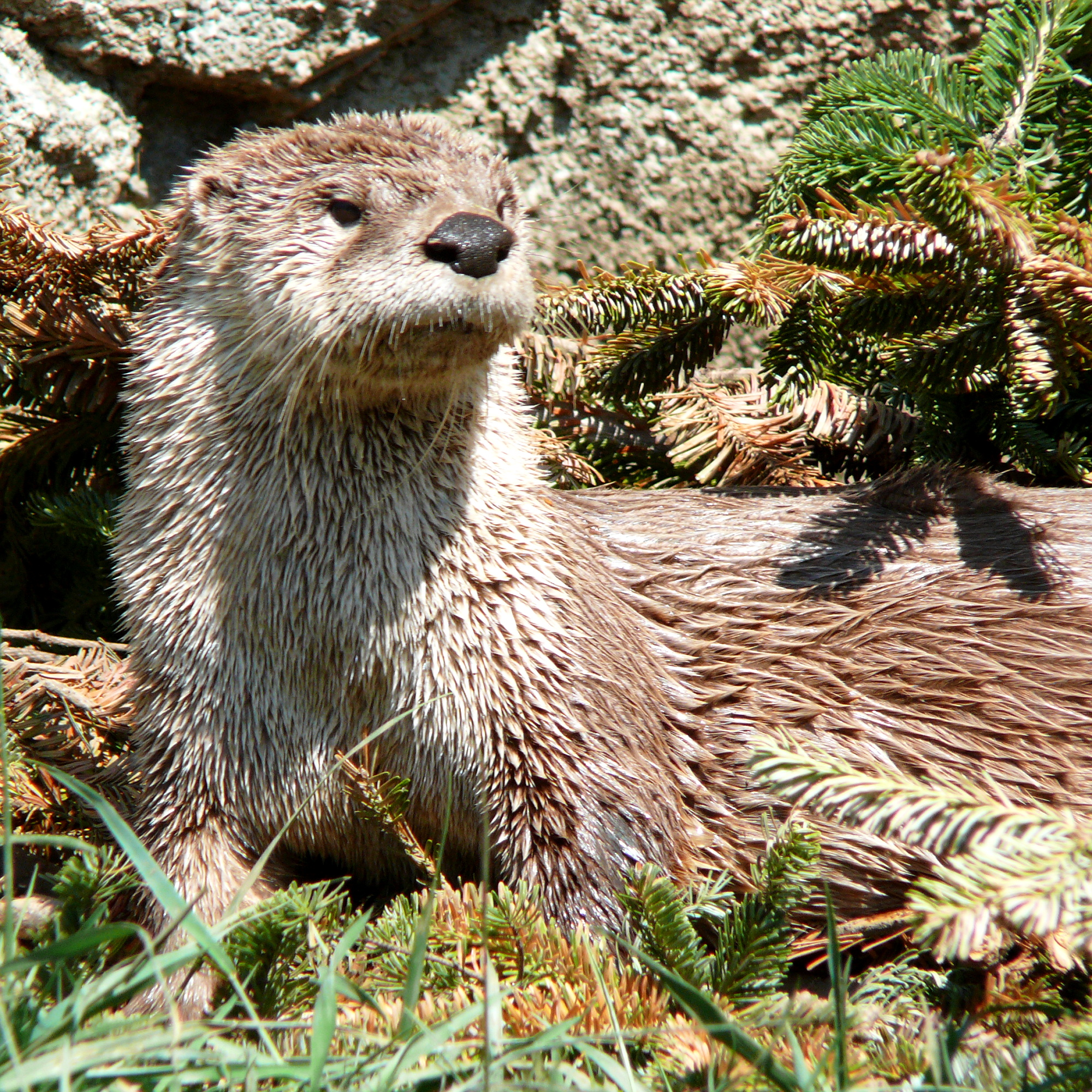
The North American river otter's sensitive whiskers allow it to detect prey in murky water.

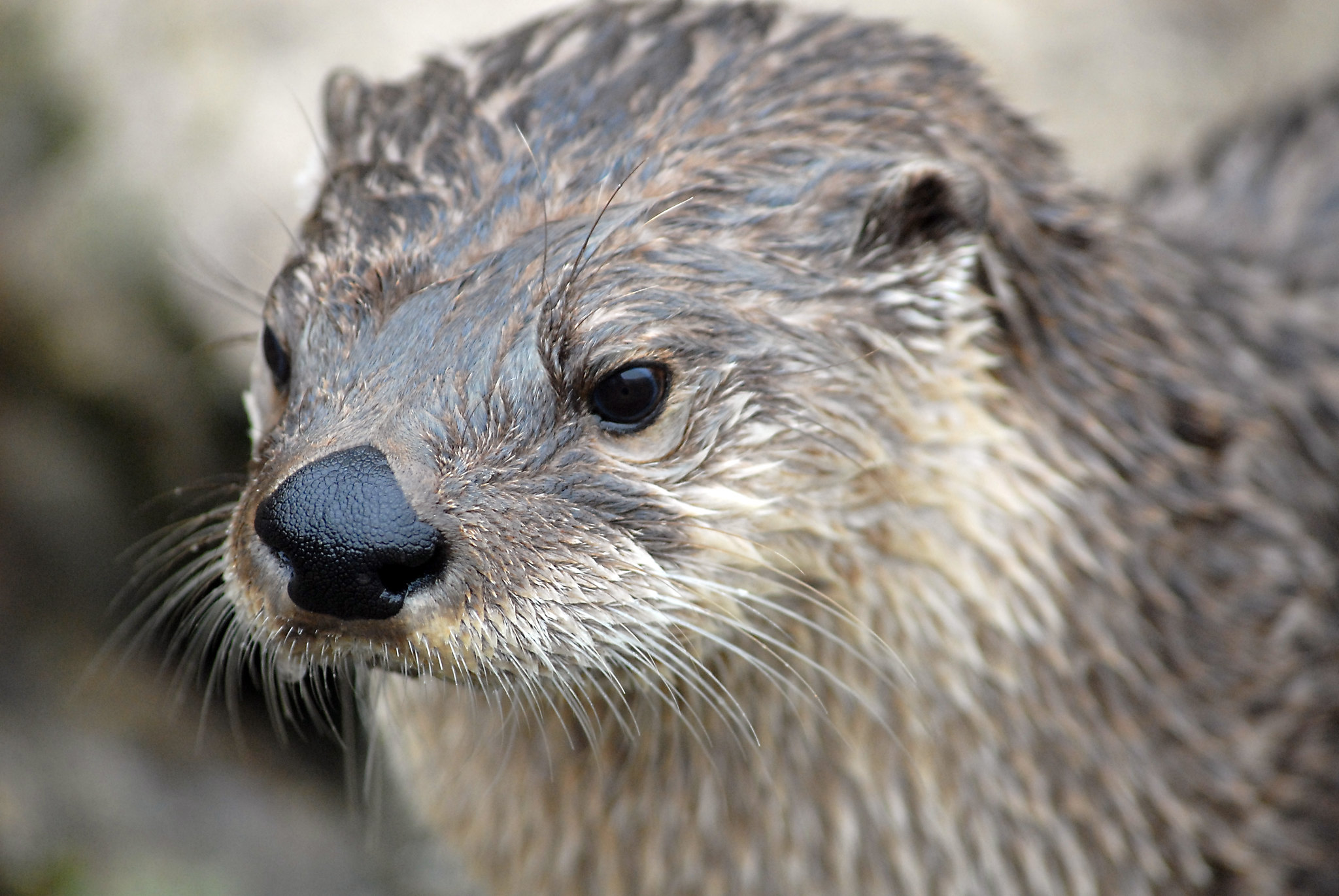
North American river otters have small ears.

North American river otters characteristically approach within a few meters (a few feet) of a boat or a person on shore due to their near-sightedness, a consequence of vision adapted for underwater sight. These otters have a transparent inner eyelid (called a nictitating membrane) to protect their eyes while swimming.

Otters, like most mustelids, have 36 specialized teeth, including sharp canines and carnassials that inflict lethal bites to prey. Also, North American river otters have large molars used for crushing hard objects, such as the shells of molluscs. Additional premolars may be present. The dental formula is 3.1.4.13.1.3.2.

== Distribution and habitat ==
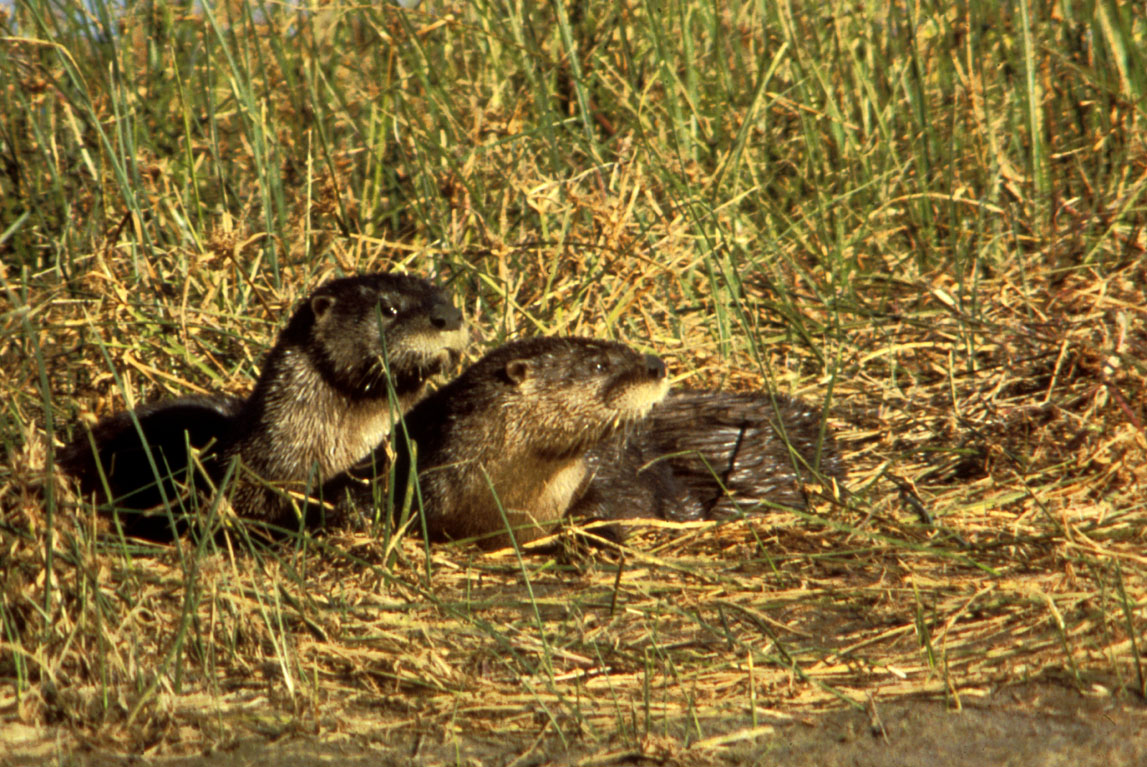
The species inhabits coastal areas, such as marshland

The North American river otter is found throughout North America, inhabiting inland waterways and coastal areas in Canada, the Pacific Northwest, the Atlantic states, and states on the Gulf of Mexico. They also inhabit the forested regions near the Pacific coast in North America. The species is also present throughout Alaska, including the Aleutian Islands, and the north slope of the Brooks Range.

Urbanization and pollution, though, have resulted in a reduction in the otters' range in the United States. They are now absent or rare in Arizona, Kansas, Nebraska, New Mexico, North Dakota, Ohio, Oklahoma, South Dakota, and Tennessee. Reintroduction projects have expanded their distribution in recent years, such as in West Virginia, and especially in the Midwestern United States. Since their reintroduction to Kentucky in the early 1990s, the otters have recovered to the point that a trapping season was implemented in 2006, and the species is now found in all of the state's major waterways. In 2010, the Colorado Department of Wildlife reported the river otter, reintroduced to the state in the 1980s, was "thriving" and recommended its protection status be reconsidered. In late 2012, a river otter nicknamed Sutro Sam took up residence around the former site of the Sutro Baths in San Francisco, the first river otter sighting in that city since the 1950s. North American river otters occupy all Canadian provinces and territories, except until recently, Prince Edward Island. Otters have recently begun re-establishing themselves on Prince Edward Island. In Minnesota, otter populations have rebounded due to reintroduction efforts in the 1980s, improvements in water quality, habitat restoration, and harvest regulation. While river otters are most common in northern Minnesota, they can be seen in urban areas including the Twin Cities.

Historical records indicate North American river otters were once populous throughout most major drainages in the continental United States and Canada prior to European settlement. North America's largest populations were found in areas with an abundance and diversity of aquatic habitats, such as coastal marshes, the Great Lakes region, and glaciated areas of New England. In addition, riverine habitats in interior regions supported smaller otter populations. The North American river otter existed on all parts of the Pacific Coast, including the seashore and inland streams and lakes. In Mexico, North American river otters lived in the Rio Grande and Colorado River Deltas.

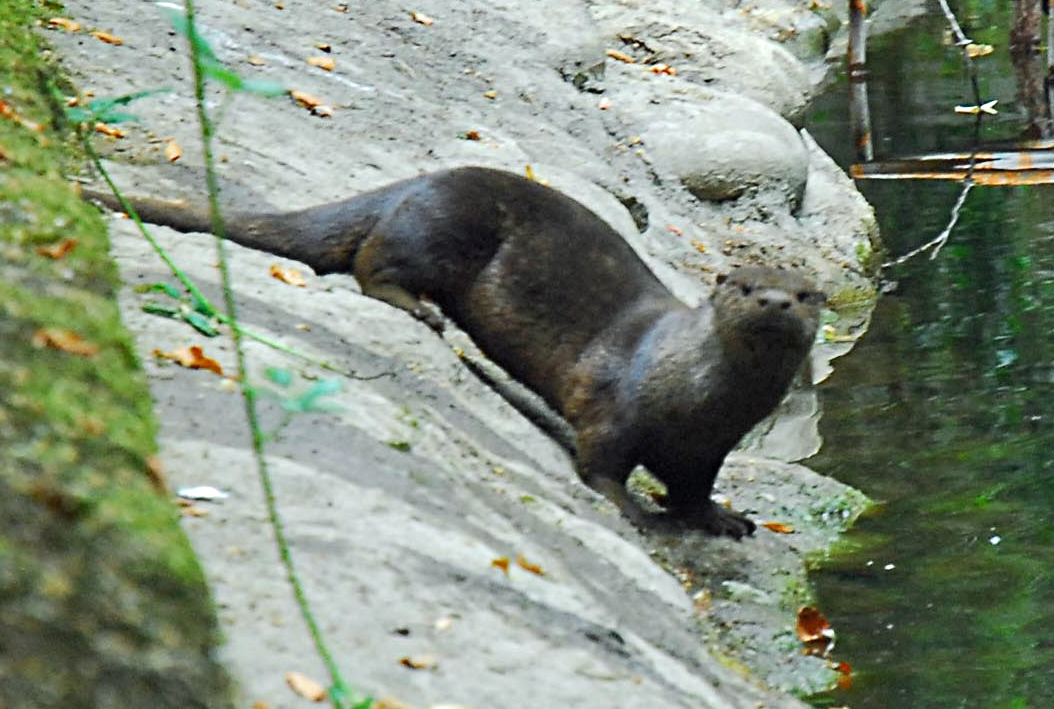
A North American river otter in San Anselmo Creek

Although commonly called a "river otter", the North American river otter is found in a wide variety of aquatic habitats, both freshwater and coastal marine, including lakes, rivers, inland wetlands, coastal shorelines, marshes, and estuaries. It can tolerate a great range of temperature and elevations. Aquatic life ties them almost exclusively to permanent watersheds. Their main requirements are a steady food supply and easy access to a body of water, but they are sensitive to pollution and disappear from tainted areas.

Like other otters, the North American river otter lives in a holt, or den, constructed in the burrows of other animals, or in natural hollows, such as under a log or in riverbanks. An entrance, which may be under water or above ground, leads to a nest chamber lined with leaves, grass, moss, bark, and hair.

== Behavior ==
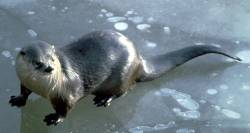
Sliding across ice is an efficient means of travel. Note the long, tapered tail.

North American river otters only settle in areas that consist of vegetation, rock piles, and sufficient coverage.

=== Playing ===
North American river otters are renowned for their sense of play. Otter play mostly consists of wrestling with conspecifics. Chasing is also a common game. They rely upon play to learn survival skills, such as fighting and hunting.

=== Hunting ===
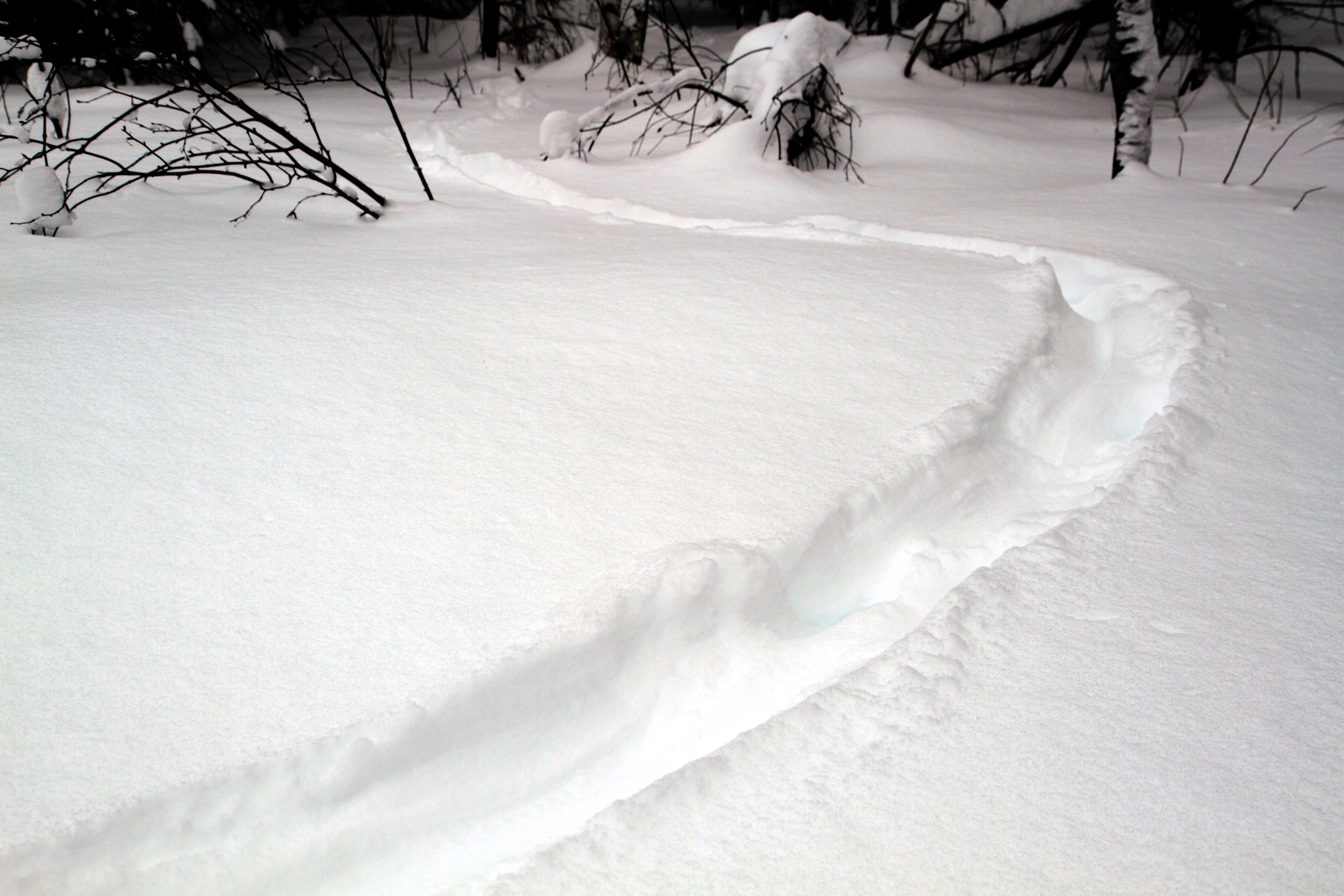
Tracks in the snow

A highly active predator, the North American river otter has adapted to hunting in water and eats aquatic and semiaquatic animals. The vulnerability and seasonal availability of prey animals mainly governs its food habits and prey choices. This availability is influenced by detectability and mobility of the prey, habitat availability for the various prey species, environmental factors, such as water depth and temperature, and seasonal changes in prey supply and distribution in correspondence with otter foraging habitat.

The diet of the North American river otter can be deduced by analyzing either stool obtained in the field, or gut contents removed from trapped otters. Fish are the primary component of the North American river otter's diet throughout the year. Every study done on the food habits of the North American river otter has identified varying fish species as being the primary component of its diet. For instance, an Alberta, Canada, study involved the collection and analysis of 1,191 samples of North American river otter scat (feces) collected during each season. Fish remnants were found in 91.9% of the samples. Moreover, a western Oregon study revealed fish remains were present in 80% of the 103 digestive tracts examined. Crustaceans (crayfish), where regionally available, are the second-most important prey for otters. Crustaceans may even be consumed more than fish. For example, a study conducted in a central California marshland indicated crayfish formed nearly 100% of the river otter's diet at certain times of the year. As foragers, though, they immediately take advantage of other prey when readily obtainable. Other prey consumed by North American river otters includes fruits, aquatic plants, reptiles, amphibians, birds (most especially ducks while moulting, which renders the birds flightless and makes them easier to capture), aquatic insects, small mammals, and mollusks. North American river otters are not scavengers; they avoid consuming carrion. They do not generally handle prey of a large size relative to themselves, but occasionally they have been observed ambushing and killing adult common snapping turtles while the large turtles (which are roughly equal in average body weight to a North American river otter) are hibernating. Remains of the much larger North American beaver have been found in North American river otter scat in some regions, although most otter dietary studies in areas where otters and beaver live near each other do not show them to be regular predators of beavers (despite the claims of fur trappers that otters frequently hunt beavers) and perhaps only young beaver kits may be attacked.

=== Ecological impacts on prey species ===
When left unchecked, though, otters can be significant predators under certain circumstances (e.g. in hatcheries or other fish culture facilities). Likewise, the potential predatory impact of otters may be considerable whenever fish are physically confined (most commonly in smaller ponds offering sparse cover or other escape options). To protect fish in these cases, the otters may need to be removed or relocated. Even in larger bodies of water, river otters may take disproportional advantage of any seasonal concentrations of fish when and where only very limited areas of suitable spawning, low-flow, or overwintering habitat may exist. Even fast-swimming fish such as trout slow down in extremely cold water, leaving them vulnerable. As such, careful consideration of any threatened, endangered, or fish species of special interest is warranted prior to reintroduction of otters to a watershed.

=== Social behavior ===
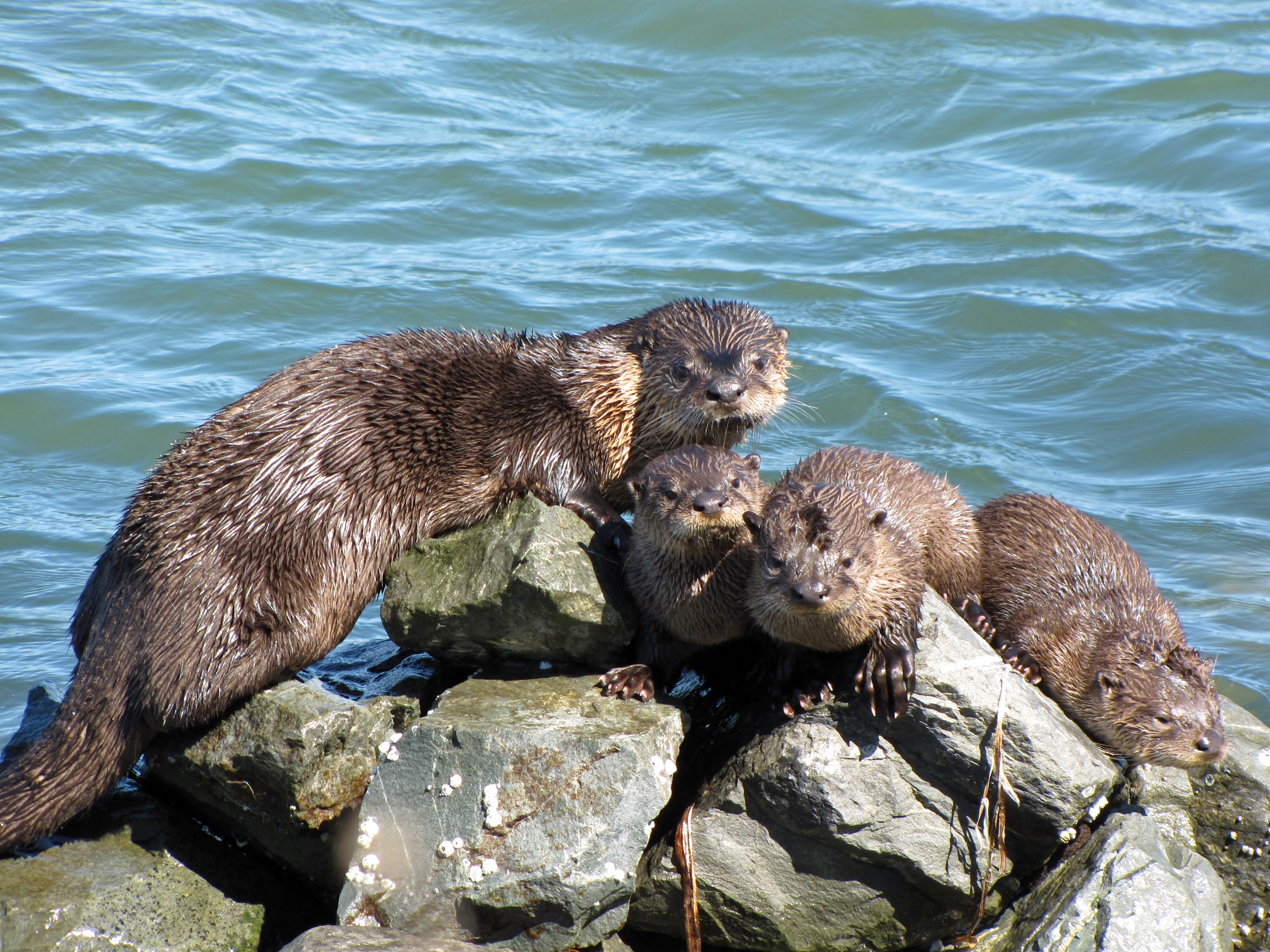
North American river otters swimming in San Francisco Bay stop to sun themselves on rocks at Richmond, California marina.

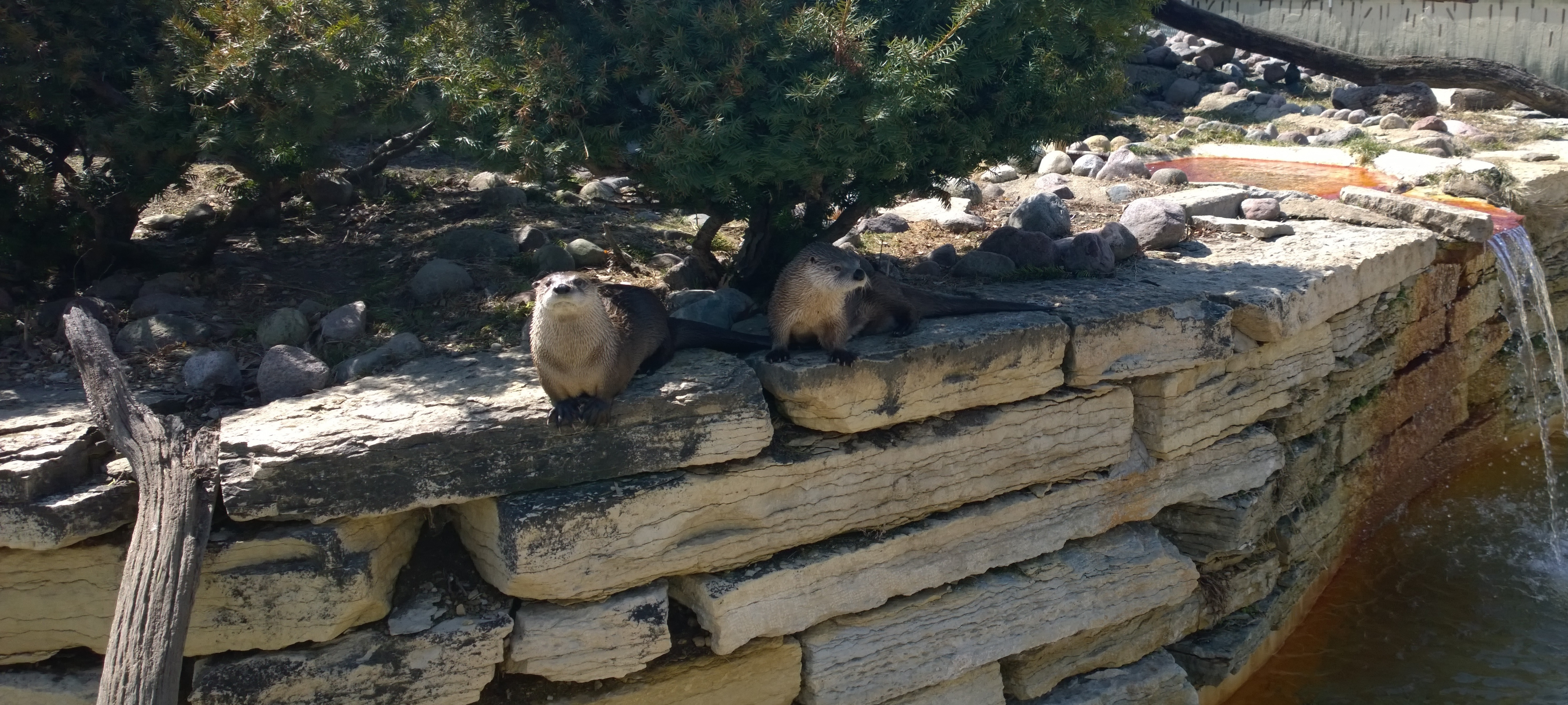
A pair of captive North American river otters at Phillips Park Zoo in Aurora, Illinois

A North American river otter can have a territory as large as 78 km^{2} (30 sq mi), but their usual territory is about 8 to 39 km^{2} (3–15 sq mi). This arguably can change during mating seasons.

Although North American river otters are known to be social animals, they can also survive by themselves. Their bodies allow them to avoid predators quite effectively, since they can dive, burrow, twist, and turn their bodies for evasive techniques, enabling them to survive attack. Famously, they love to play together, which creates strong social bonds, improves hunting skills, and marks territory. North American river otters are not aggressively territorial, but frequently scent-mark certain spots to make their presence known.

=== Reproduction and lifecycle ===
Delayed implantation distinguishes the species from the Eurasian otter, which does not do this.

In early spring, expectant mothers begin to look for a den where they can give birth. The female otters do not dig their own dens; instead, they rely on other animals, such as beavers, to provide suitable environments to raise their offspring. When the mothers have established their domains, they give birth to several kits. Litter size can reach five, but usually ranges from one to three. Each otter pup weighs approximately five ounces.

The mothers raise their young without aid from adult males. When the pups are about two months old and their coats grow in, their mother introduces them to the water. North American river otters are natural swimmers, and with parental supervision, they easily acquire the skills necessary to swim. North American river otters may leave the den by eight weeks old and are capable of sustaining themselves by autumn, but they usually stay with their families, which sometimes include the father, until the following spring. Prior to the arrival of the next litter, the yearlings venture out in search of their own home ranges.

== Ecology ==
=== Diet ===
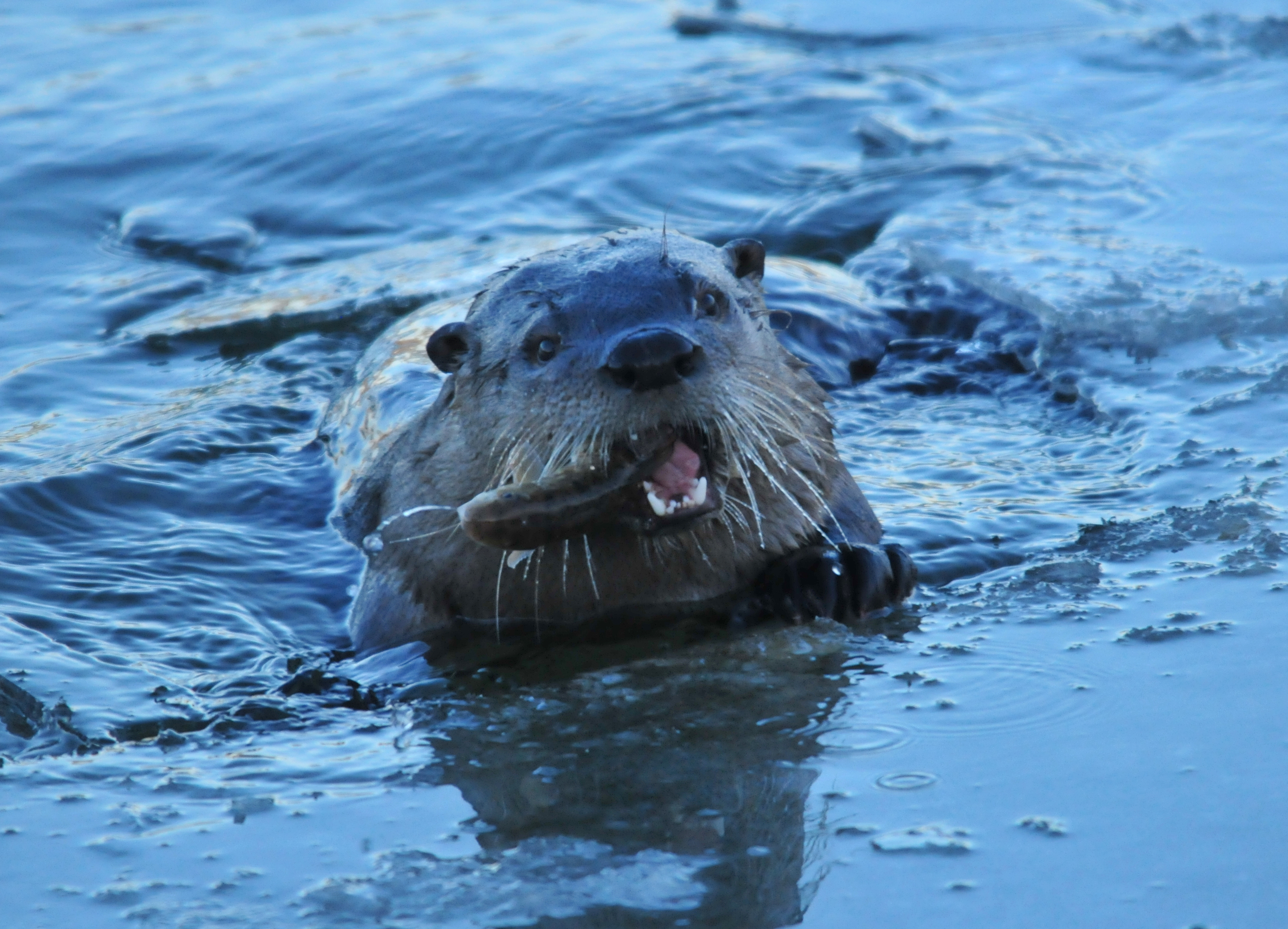
North American river otter eating a white sucker (Catostomus commersonii) at the Seedskadee National Wildlife Refuge (Wyoming)

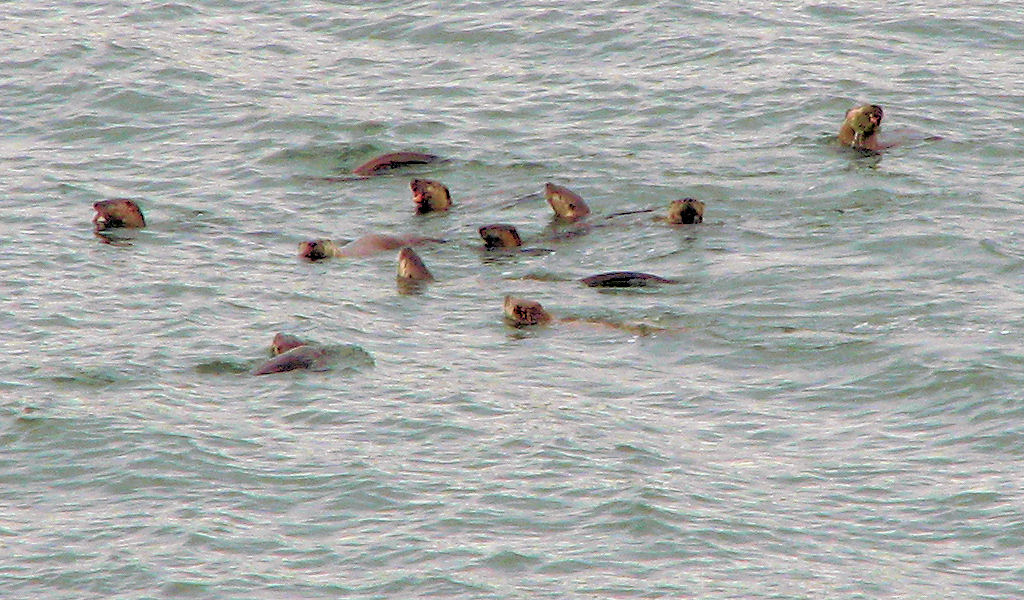
Raft of North American river otter surfacing to eat fish

The diet of the North American River otters is extensive and mostly consists of fish, frogs, crayfish, turtles, insects, and some small mammals. They are known to hunt in pairs or alone and can hunt on both land and in the water. Lontra canadensis is a predator adapted to hunting in water, feeding on aquatic and semiaquatic animals. The vulnerability and seasonal availability of prey animals primarily determine their food habits and prey preferences.

==== Fish ====
North American river otters consume an extensive assortment of fish species ranging in size from 2 to 50 cm (0.79–19.69 in) that impart sufficient caloric intake for a minute amount of energy expenditure. They generally feed on prey that is in good supply and easy to catch. As a result, slow-swimming fish are consumed more often than game fishes when both are equally available. Slow-moving species include suckers (Catostomidae), catfish, sunfish and bass (Centrarchidae), daces, carp, and shiners (Cyprinidae). For instance, Catostomidae are the primary dietary component of North American river otters in Colorado's Upper Colorado River Basin. Likewise, the common carp (Cyprinus carpio) is a preferred fish species for them in other regions of Colorado. Fish species frequently found in the diets of the North American river otters include: Catostomidae, which consists of suckers (Catostomus spp.) and redhorses (Moxostoma spp.); Cyprinidae, made up of carp (Cyprinus spp.), chubs (Semotilus spp.), daces (Rhinichthys spp.), shiners (Notropis and Richardsonius spp.), and squawfishes (Ptychocheilus spp.); and Ictaluridae, which consists of bullheads and catfish (Ictalurus spp.). Other fish an integral part of the North American river otters' diets are those that are often plentiful and found in large schools: sunfish (Lepomis spp.); darters (Etheostoma spp.); and perches (Perca spp.). Bottom-dwelling species, which have the tendency to remain immobile until a predator is very close, are susceptible to North American river otters. These include Central mudminnows (Umbra limi) and sculpins (Cottus spp.). Game fish, such as trout (Salmonidae) and pike (Esocidae), are not a significant component of their diets. They are less likely to be prey for the North American river otters since they are fast-swimming and can find good escape cover. However, river otters will prey on trout, pike, walleye (Sander vitreus vitreus), salmon (Oncorhynchus spp.), and other game fish during spawning. Otters have been found to consume invasive Asian carp.

Adult North American river otters are capable of consuming 1.0–1.5 kilograms (2.2–3.3 lb) of fish per day. A study conducted on captive otters revealed they preferred larger fish, ranging from 15 to 17 cm (5.9–6.7 in), more than smaller fish, ranging from 8 to 10 cm (3.1–3.9 in), and they had difficulty catching fish species less than 10 cm (3.9 in) or larger than 17 cm (6.7 in). Otters are known to take larger fish on land to eat, whereas smaller fish are consumed in the water.

==== Crustaceans ====
North American river otters may prefer to feed on crustaceans, especially crayfish (Cambarus, Pacifasticus, and others) and crabs more than fish where they are locally and seasonally plentiful. In Georgia, crayfish accounted for two-thirds of the prey in the summer diet, and their remnants were present in 98% of the summer spraint. In the winter, crayfish made up one-third of the North American river otter's diet. A study conducted on North American river otters in a southwestern Arkansas swamp identified a correlation between crayfish consumption, fish consumption, and water levels.

During the winter and spring, when the water levels were higher, North American river otters had a greater tendency to prey upon crayfish (73% of scats had crayfish remains) rather than fish. When water levels are lower, though, crayfish seek out shelter while fish become more highly concentrated and susceptible to predation. Therefore, fish are more vulnerable to being preyed upon by otters because the crayfish have become more difficult to obtain.

==== Reptiles and amphibians ====
Amphibians, where regionally accessible, have been found in the North American river otter's diet during the spring and summer, as indicated in many of the food habit studies. The most common amphibians and reptiles recognized were frogs (Rana and Hyla). Specific species of reptiles and amphibians prey include: boreal chorus frogs (Pseudacris maculata); Canadian toads (Bufo hemiophrys); wood frogs (Rana sylvatica); American bullfrogs (Rana catesbeiana); green frogs (Rana clamitans); northwestern salamanders (Ambystoma gracile); California giant salamander (Dicamptodon ensatus); rough-skinned newt (Taricha granulosa); and garter snakes (Thamnophis).

Amphibians and reptiles are more obtainable by the North American river otter during the spring and summer as a result of breeding activity, appropriate temperatures, and water supply for the prey.

==== Birds ====
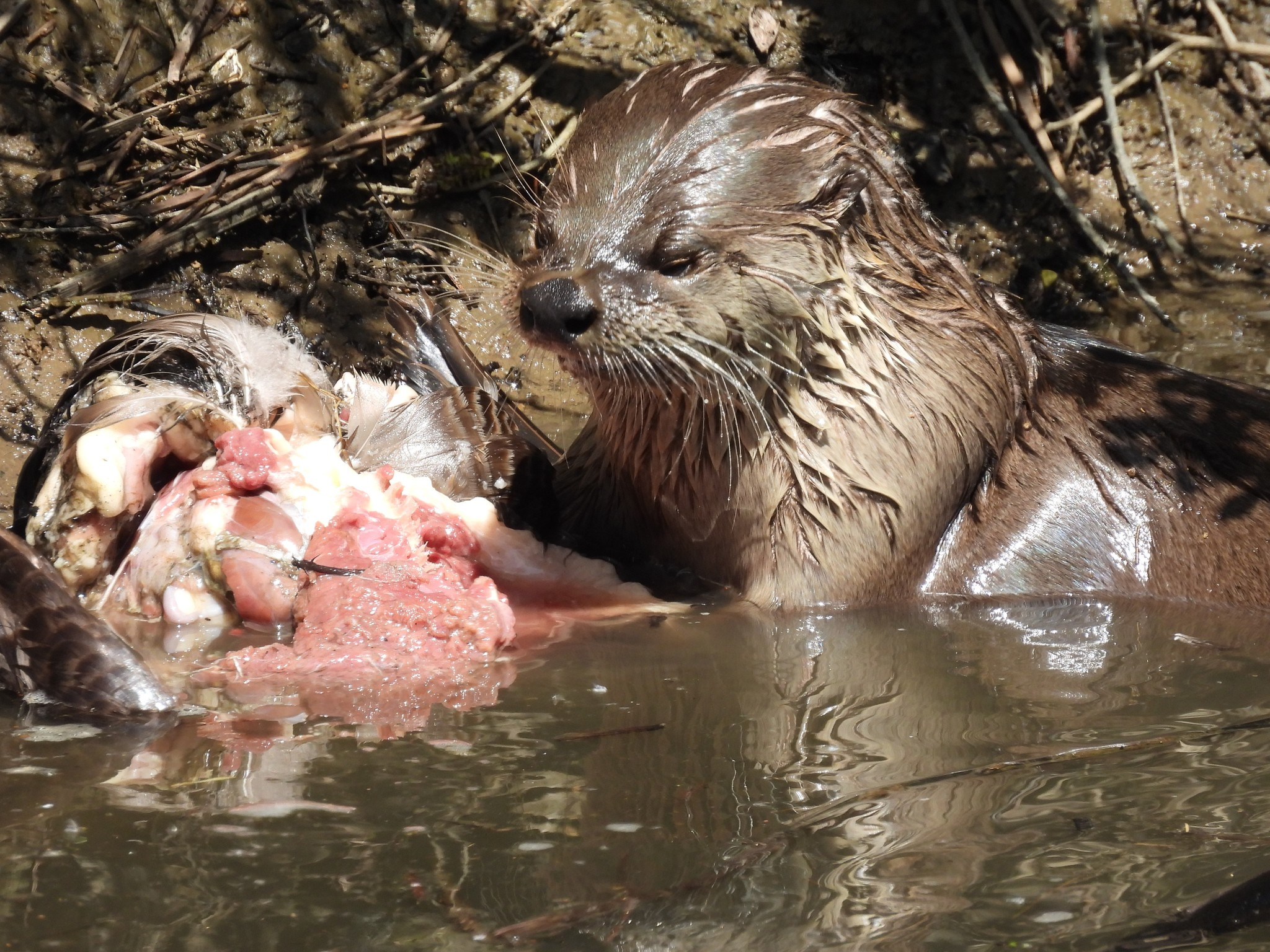
Feeding on waterfowl, in California

Waterfowl, rails, and some colonial nesting birds are preyed upon by North American river otters in various areas. Susceptibility of these species is greatest during the summer (when waterfowl broods are vulnerable) and autumn. The North American river otters have also been known to catch and consume moulting American wigeon (Mareca americana) and green-winged teal (Anas crecca). Other species of birds found within their diets include: northern pintail (Anas carolinensis); mallard (Anas platyrhynchos); canvasback (Aythya valisineria); ruddy duck (Oxyura jamaicensis); and the American coot (Fulica americana).

Although they consume birds, North American river otters do not feed on bird eggs.

==== Insects ====
Aquatic invertebrates have been recognized as an integral part of the North American river otter's diet. Otters consume more aquatic insects in the summer as the populations increase and specific life stages heighten their susceptibility. Most aquatic invertebrates preyed upon by the otters are from the orders Odonata (dragonfly nymphs), Plecoptera (stonefly nymphs), and Coleoptera (adult beetles). Invertebrates discovered within scats or digestive tracts could most likely be a secondary food item, first being consumed by the fish that are subsequently preyed upon by the North American river otters.

==== Mammals ====
Mammals are rarely consumed by North American river otters, and are not a major dietary component. Mammals preyed upon by North American river otters are characteristically small or are a type species found in riparian zones. The few occurrences of mammals found in the North American river otter's diet include remains of the muskrat (Ondatra zibethicus); meadow vole (Microtus pennsylvanicus); eastern cottontail (Sylvilagus floridanus); and snowshoe hare (Lepus americanus).

Records of North American otters preying upon North American beavers (Castor canadensis) vary; it has been reported in the southern boreal forest of Manitoba. Trappers in Alberta, Canada commonly assert North American river otters are major predators of North American beavers. A 1994 river otter study reported findings of beaver remains in 27 of 1,191 scats analyzed. However, many other studies did not report any findings of North American beaver remains in the scat sampled.

=== Predators ===
Aquatic predators of the North American river otter include the American alligator (Alligator mississippiensis), American crocodile (Crocodylus acutus), and killer whale (Orcinus orca), none of which commonly coexist with the North American river otter and thus rarely pose a threat. Terrestrial predators include the bobcat (Lynx rufus), cougar (Puma concolor), coyote (Canis latrans), domestic dog (Canis familiaris), wolf (Canis lupus), American black bear (Ursus americanus), bald eagle (Haliaeetus leucocephalus), and red fox (Vulpes vulpes), grizzly bears (Ursus arctos horribilis) and polar bears (Ursus maritimus)

== Threats ==
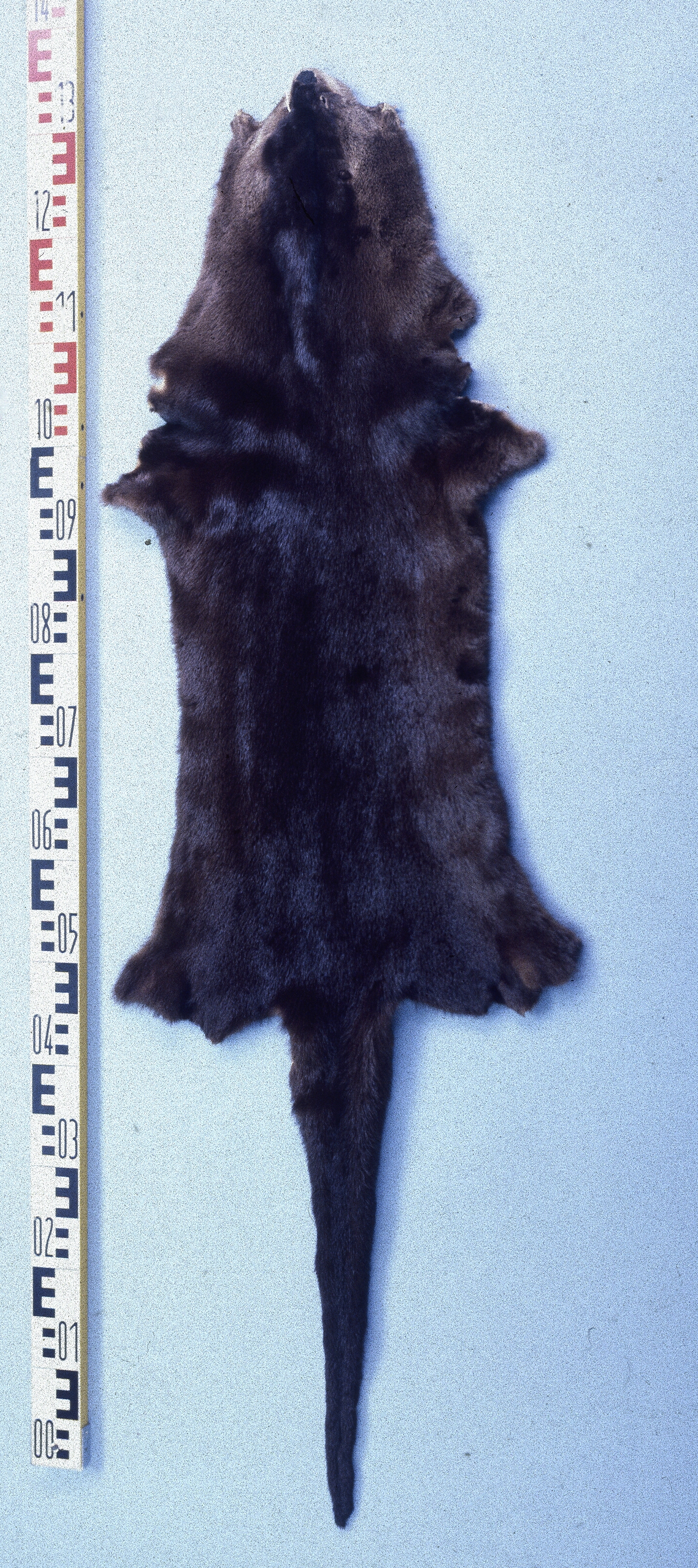
North American river otters are hunted and trapped for their valuable fur

Threats to North American river otter populations in North America vary regionally. North American river otter inhabitation is affected by type, distribution, and density of aquatic habitats and characteristics of human activities. Preceding the settlement of North America by Europeans, North American river otters were prevalent among aquatic habitats throughout most of the continent. Trapping, loss or degradation of aquatic habitats through filling of wetlands, and development of coal, oil, gas, tanning, timber, and other industries, resulted in local extinctions or population declines in North American river otter populations in many areas. In 1980, an examination conducted on U.S. river otter populations determined they were locally extinct in 11 states, and lost significant population in 9 other states. The most severe population declines occurred in interior regions where fewer aquatic habitats supported fewer otter populations. Although the distribution became reduced in some regions of southern Canada, the only province-wide extinction occurred on Prince Edward Island.

During the 1970s, improvements in natural resource management techniques emerged, along with increased concerns about North American river otter population declines in North America. Consequently, many wildlife management agencies developed strategies to restore or enhance otter populations, including the use of reintroduction projects. Since 1976, over 4,000 otters have been reintroduced in 21 U.S. states. All Canadian provinces except Prince Edward Island and 29 U.S. states have viable populations that sustain annual harvests. While current harvest strategies do not pose a threat to maintaining otter populations, harvest may limit expansion of otter populations in some areas.

Oil spills present a localized threat to otter populations, especially in coastal areas. Water pollution and other diminution of aquatic and wetland habitats may limit distribution and pose long-term threats if the enforcement of water quality standards is not upheld. Acid drainage from coal mines is a persistent water quality issue in some areas, as it eliminates otter prey. This dilemma prevents, and consequently inhibits, recolonization or growth of North American river otter populations. Recently, long-term genetic consequences of reintroduction projects on remnant North American river otter populations has been discussed. Similarly, many perceived threats to North American river otters, such as pollution and habitat alterations, have not been rigorously evaluated. Little effort has gone into assessing the threat of disease to wild North American river otter populations, so it is poorly understood and documented.

== Conservation ==
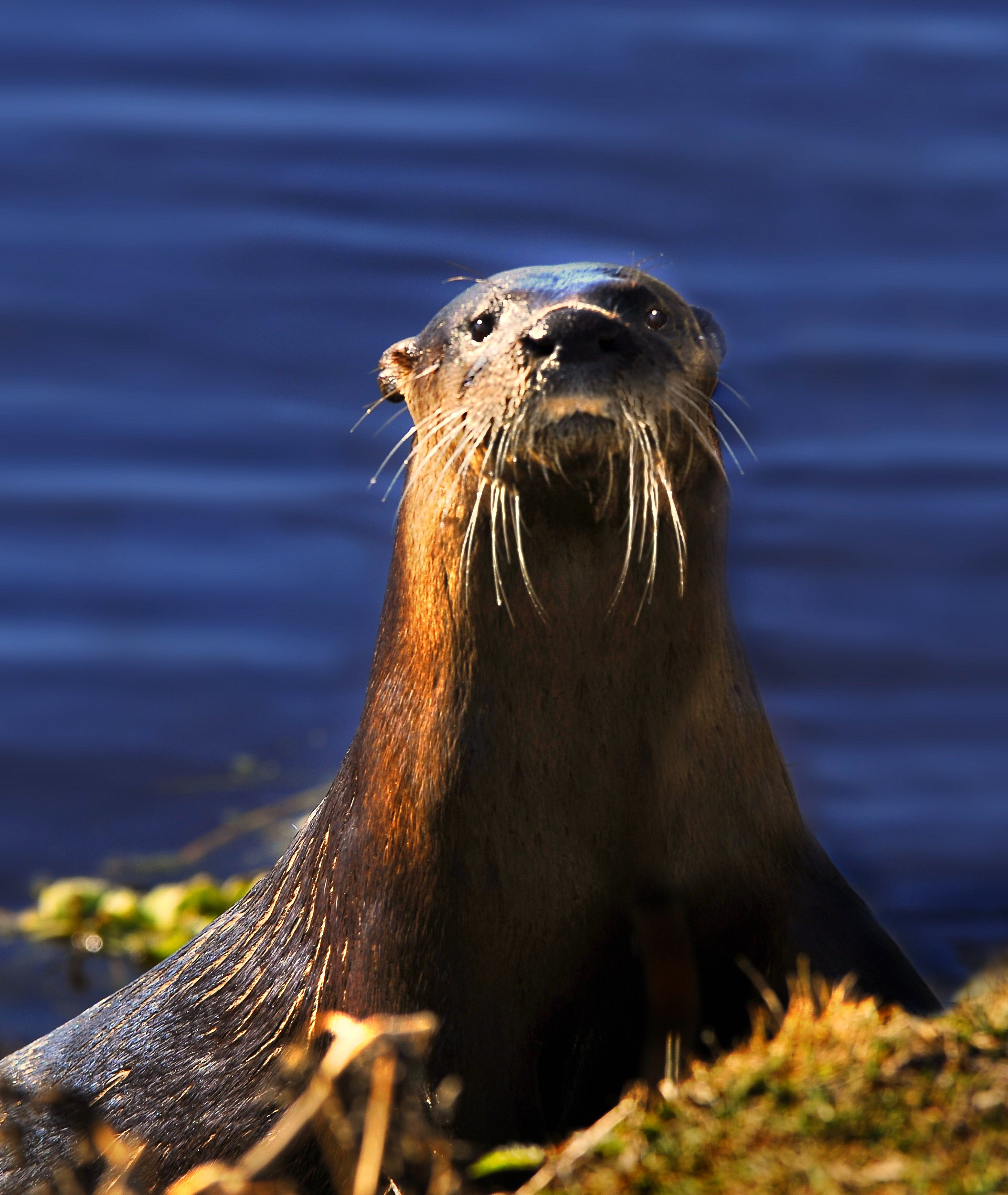
Improvements in water quality and reintroduction projects have been particularly valuable in restoring otter populations in many areas of North America

Lontra canadensis is listed in Appendix II of the Convention on International Trade in Endangered Species of Wild Fauna and Flora (CITES). They have been virtually eliminated through many parts of their range, especially around heavily populated areas in the midwestern and eastern United States. Appendix II lists species that are not necessarily threatened with extinction currently, but may become so unless trade is closely controlled.

The North American river otter is considered a species of least concern according to the IUCN Red List, as it is not currently declining at a rate sufficient for a threat category. By the early 1900s, North American river otter populations had declined throughout large portions of their historic range in North America. However, improvements in water quality (through enactment of clean water regulations) and furbearer management techniques have permitted river otters to regain portions of their range in many areas. Reintroduction projects have been particularly valuable in restoring populations in many areas of the United States. However, North American river otters remain rare or absent in the southwestern United States. Water quality and development inhibit recovery of populations in some areas. The species is widely distributed throughout its range. In many places, the populations have re-established themselves because of conservation initiatives. Reintroduction of river otters may present a problem in that it may contaminate the genetic structure of the native population.
