= Phillips Park Zoo =

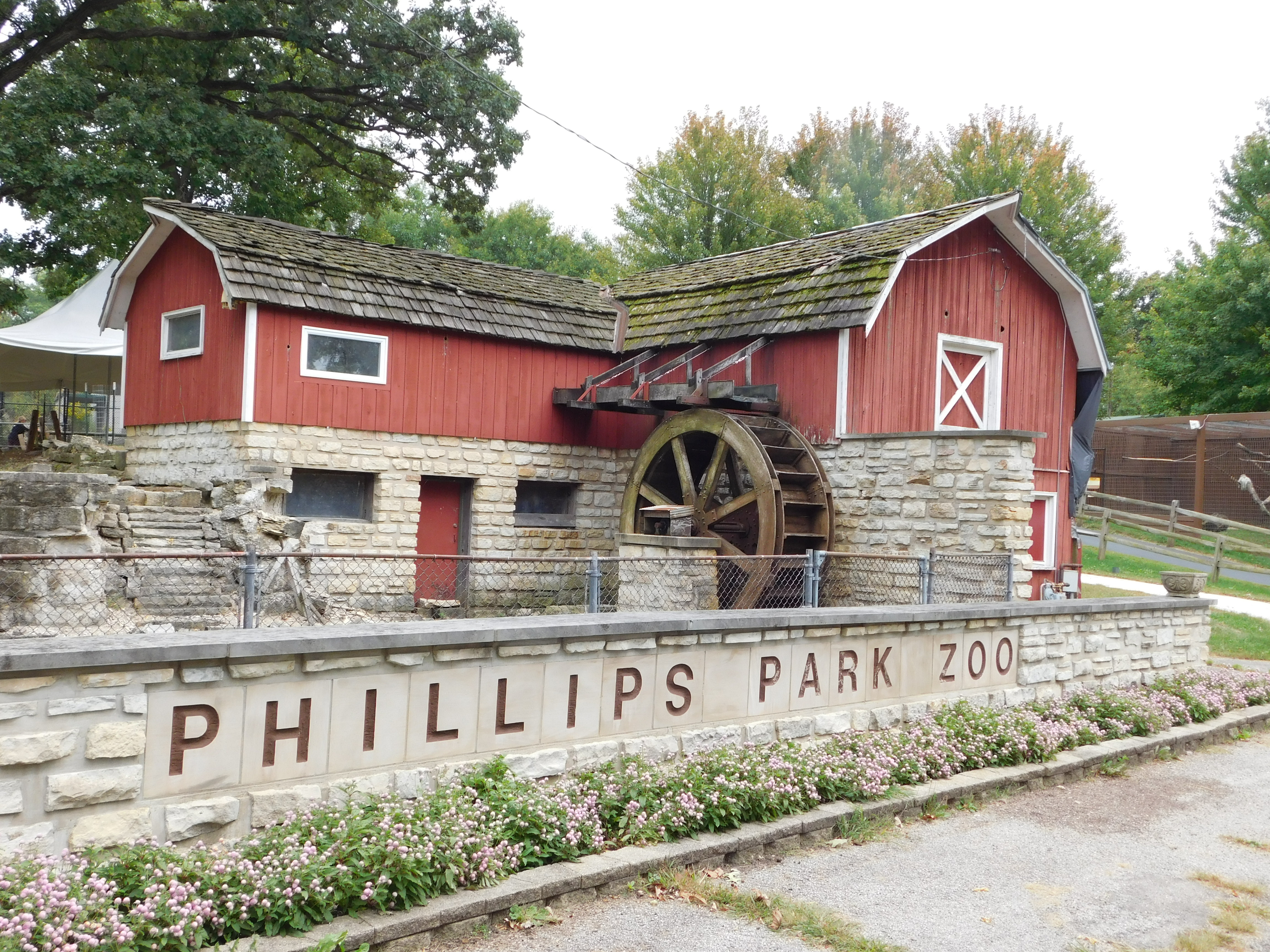
- Entrance to the zoo, 2018
- Interactive map of Phillips Park Zoo
- 41.7363°N 88.2948°W
- Date opened: 1915
- Location: Aurora, Illinois
- Website: https://www.aurora-il.org/150/Phillips-Park-Zoo

Phillips Park Zoo is located on the grounds of Phillips Park, in Aurora, Illinois, United States. It was originally established in 1915, and is still open year-round with no admission charge. It was once home to exotic animals such as giraffes and monkeys, but the zoo's focus changed to native animals after Brookfield Zoo opened in 1934.

== History ==
After Phillips Park Zoo was established in 1915, a birdhouse was built in 1916. By 1920, the zoo had 5 black bears, 10 monkeys, 19 elk with 19 buffalo, 2 foxes, 1 wolf, and 20 deer, in addition to hundreds of birds. Unfortunately, a hailstorm destroyed the original birdhouse in 1933. After the loss of the birdhouse and Brookfield Zoo opening in 1934, the Phillips Park Zoo refocused on displaying native animals. In 1937, mastodon bones and tusks, which were found in the park, were on display at the zoo causing it to also be known as a museum. Only two major projects took place in the zoo history between 1937 and the 1980s. In 1950, a barn was built. Then in 1964, a water wheel was added to the zoo. Swans and other farmyard animals now have their exhibits around these original structures. From the 1980s to the present time, the zoo has created new exhibit areas and added additional animals. The latest of these additions was the cougar exhibit which opened in 2005. Extensive work has also been done on the exhibits for otters, wolves, elks, and remodeling the reptile house. Animal additions included two bald eagles named Kenai and Denali, and Chopper the Caiman.

== Exhibits ==
Exhibits shown on the zoo map include North American river otters, great horned owls, llamas and pygmy goats, gray wolves, farmyard animals including ducks, geese and swans, bald eagles, reptiles from over ten different species along with a variety of smaller animals, Indian peafowl, and elk. There is also Education Center which is used by the ZooCiety for various activities throughout the year.

== Gallery ==
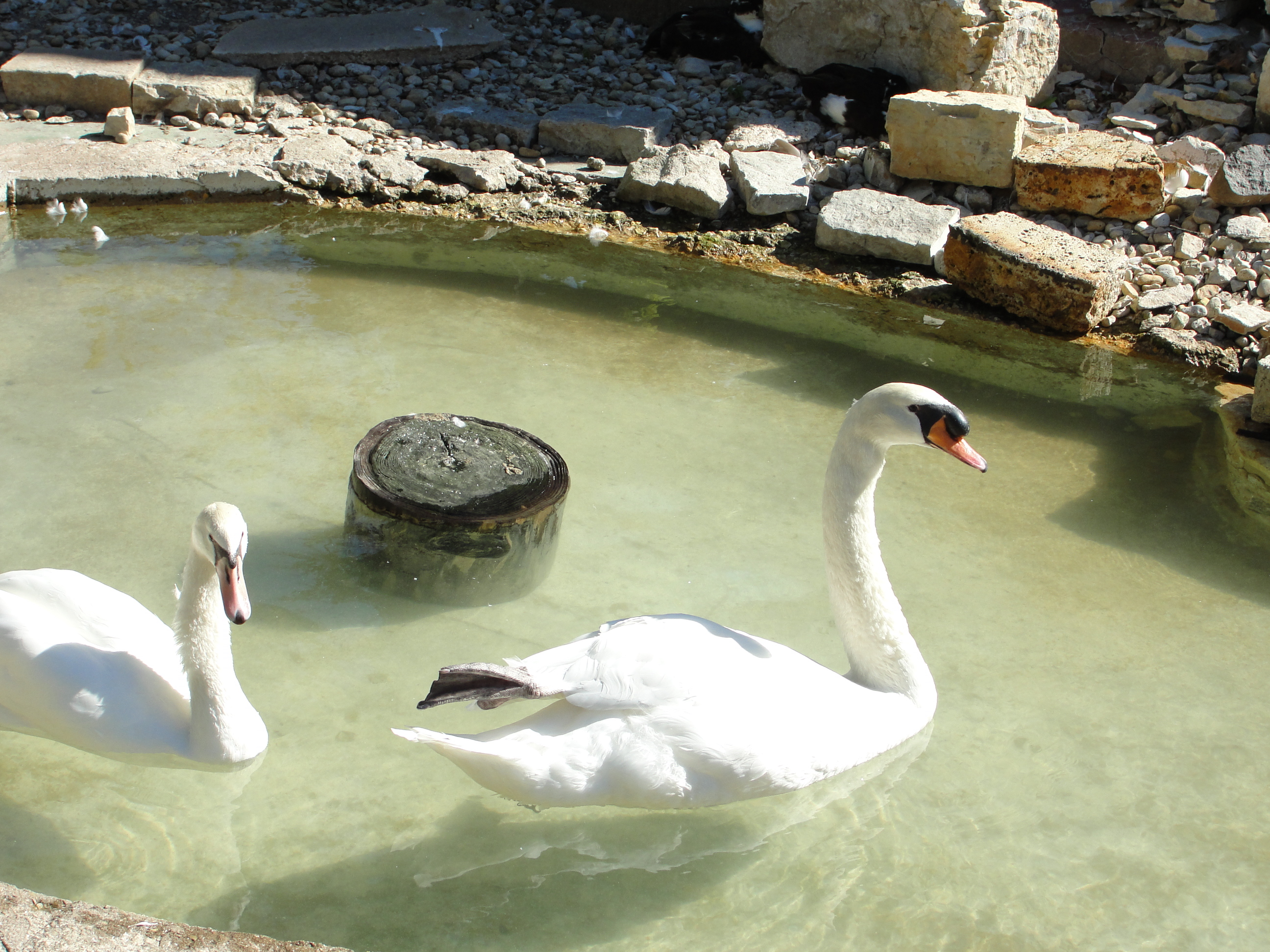
Swan at Phillips Park

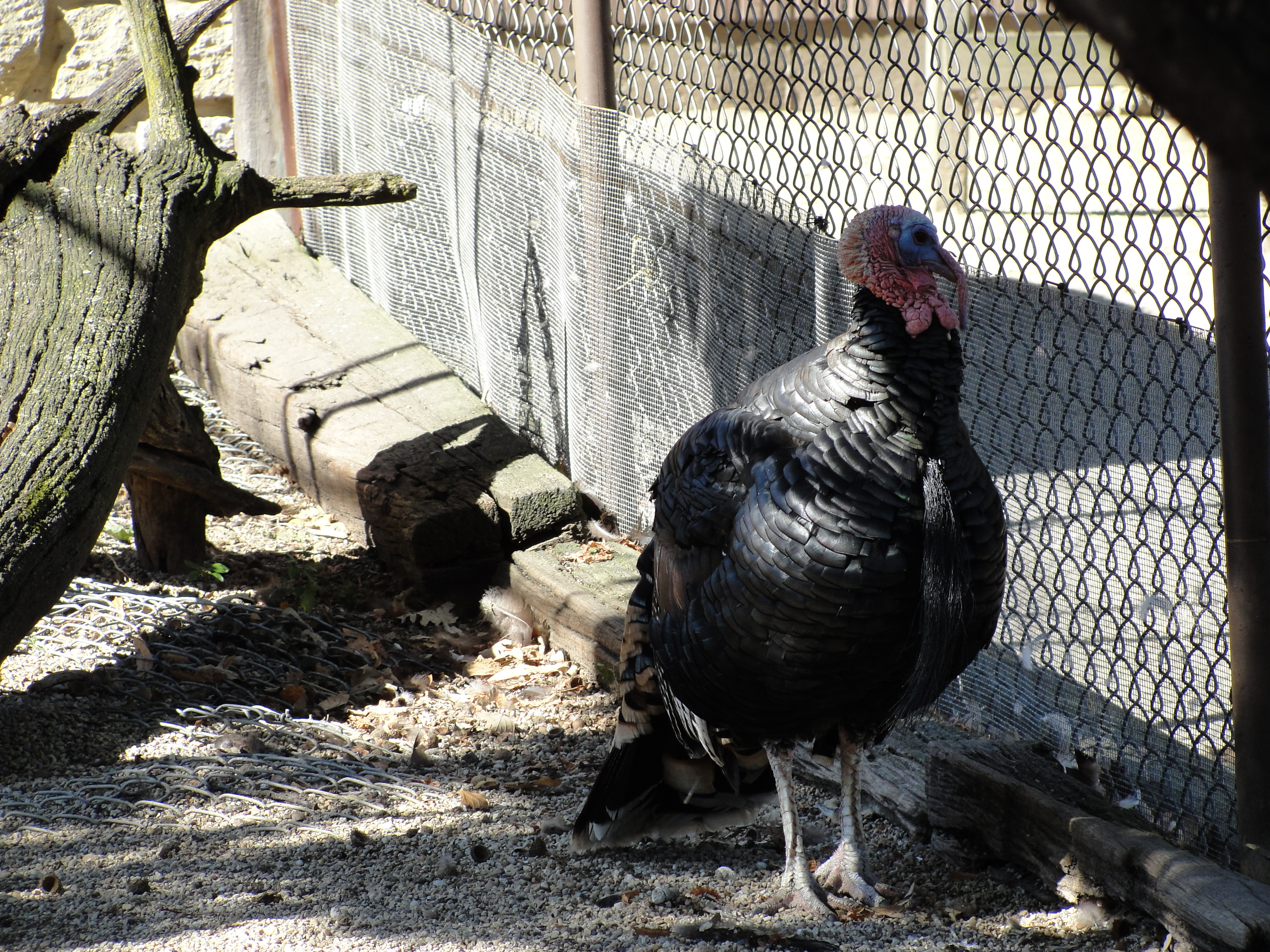
Turkey at Phillips Park

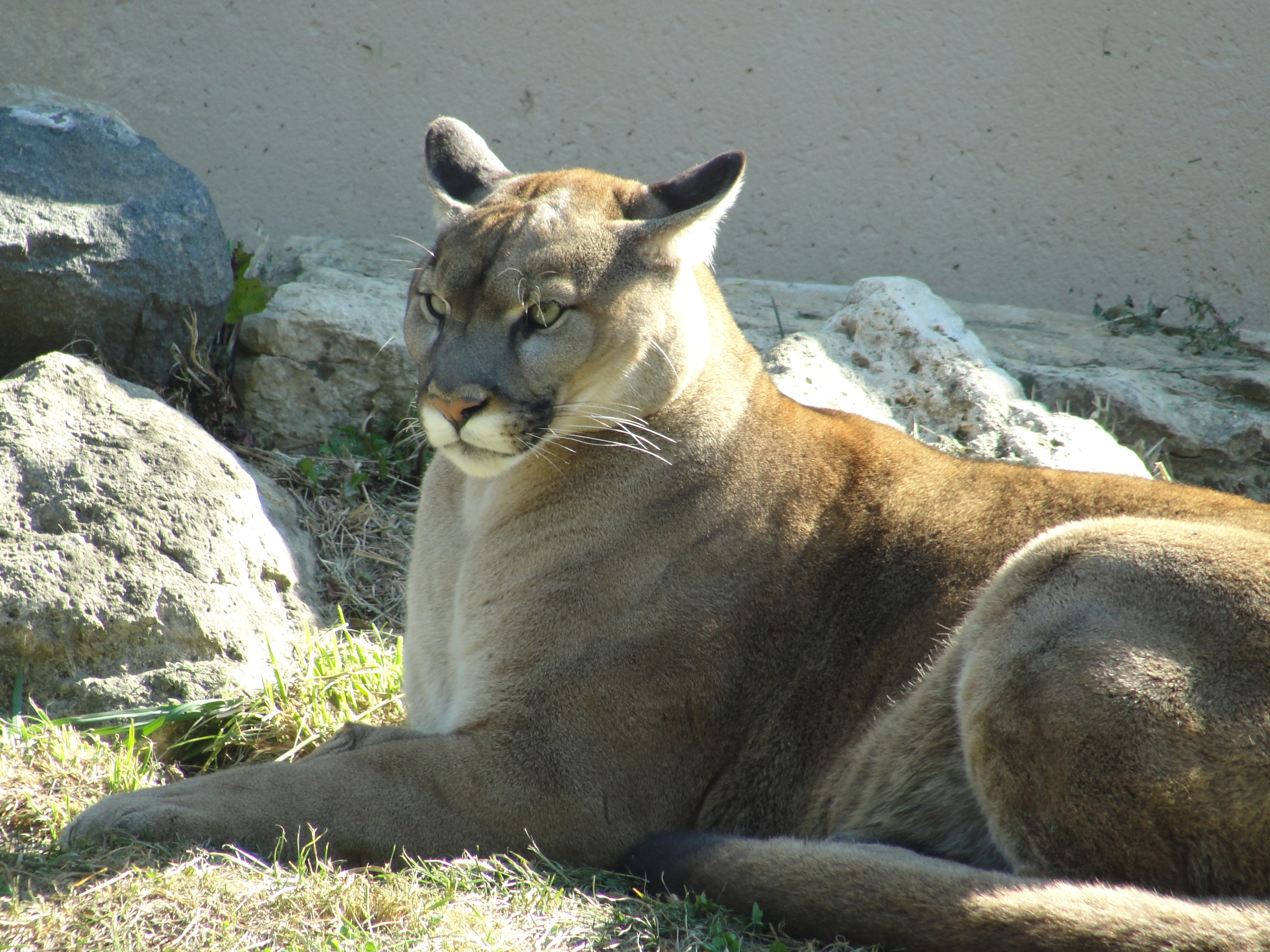
Cougar at Phillips Park

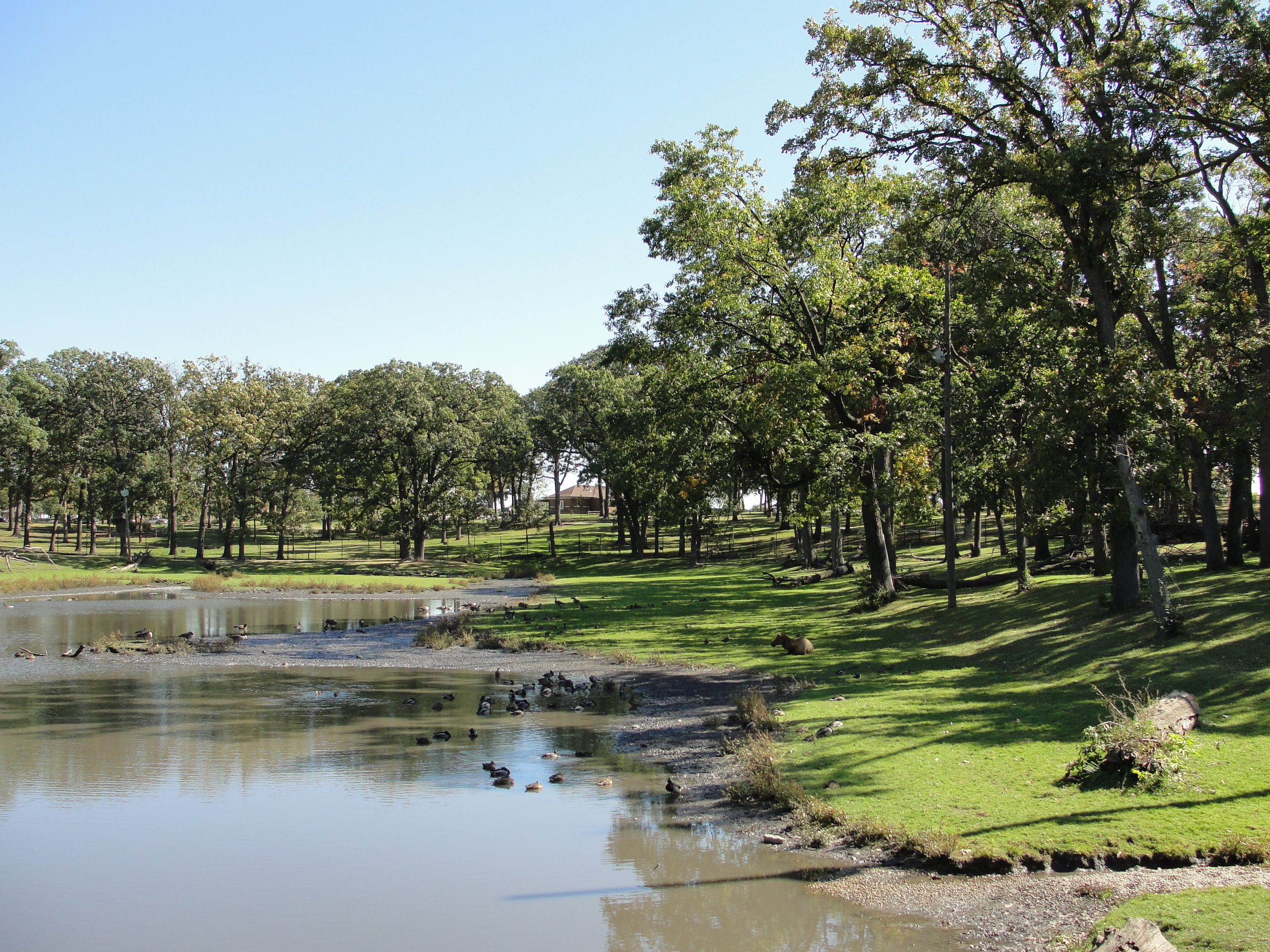
Elk Exhibit
