= Fox Valley Park District =

Park district in Illinois, United States

Coordinates: 41.7722°N 88.3114°W

The Fox Valley Park District was founded in 1947 to protect scenic vistas and land alongside the Fox River.

It is the second largest park district in Illinois, serving a population of more than 230,000 that includes the communities of Aurora, North Aurora, Montgomery and portions of Sugar Grove. Located approximately 40 miles (64 km) west of Chicago, the Park District's service area encompasses 65 square miles (170 km^{2}) that include portions of Kane, DuPage, Kendall and Will counties.

In 2009, Fox Valley was awarded a National Gold Medal award for excellence in parks in recreation.

The Park District is governed by a seven-member Board of Commissioners. Since 2017, the board consists of seven elected commissioners, whereas prior to 2017, trustees were appointed by Kane and DuPage County board members.
