= Ge Chutong =

Chinese swimmer (born 2003)

Personal information
- Native name: 葛楚彤
- Nationality: Chinese
- Born: 23 September 2003 (age 22) Zhifu, Shandong, China

Sport
- Sport: Swimming
Medal record
Women's swimming
Representing China
Olympic Games
Bronze medal – third place	2024 Paris	4×200 m freestyle
World University Games
Silver medal – second place	2025 Rhine-Ruhr	4×100 m freestyle
Silver medal – second place	2025 Rhine-Ruhr	4×200 m freestyle

Ge Chutong (Chinese: 葛楚彤; born 23 September 2003) is a Chinese swimmer. She competed at the 2024 Summer Olympics and won a bronze medal in the 4 × 200 m freestyle relay.

== Biography ==
Ge was born on 23 September 2003 and grew up in Zhifu, Yantai, Shandong, China. She started training as a swimmer under coach Cong Jingjing, at the Yantai Swimming Training Center, during kindergarten. She competed internationally for the first time in 2017, winning a silver medal in the 400m medley at the 9th Asian Age Group Championships, in Uzbekistan. She competed at the national championships in 2018 and 2019, also winning gold at the National Youth Games in the latter year, in the 200m freestyle event.

Ge ranked fourth at the 2020 national championships in the 400m medley. She won silver in the event at the 2021 national championships and bronze in the 4 × 200 m relay. She won two medals at the 2021 summer championships and narrowly lost to Yu Yiting at the 2021 National Games of China, in the 400m medley. She represented China at the 2022 World Aquatics Championships in three events, with her best finish being sixth, in the 400m medley. Ge won a silver medal at the 2022 national championships and also participated at the 2022 FINA World Swimming Championships (25 m).

In 2023, Ge won two silver medals at the spring national championships. She won a bronze medal in the 4 × 200 m freestyle relay event at the 2023 World Aquatics Championships and later that year won gold in the same event at the Asian Games. In April 2024, she won three medals, including one gold, at the national championships. She was selected to compete for China at the 2024 Summer Olympics in the 4 × 200 m freestyle relay, where she helped her team win the bronze medal.
