= Eldborg í Bláfjöllum =

Volcanic mountain in Iceland

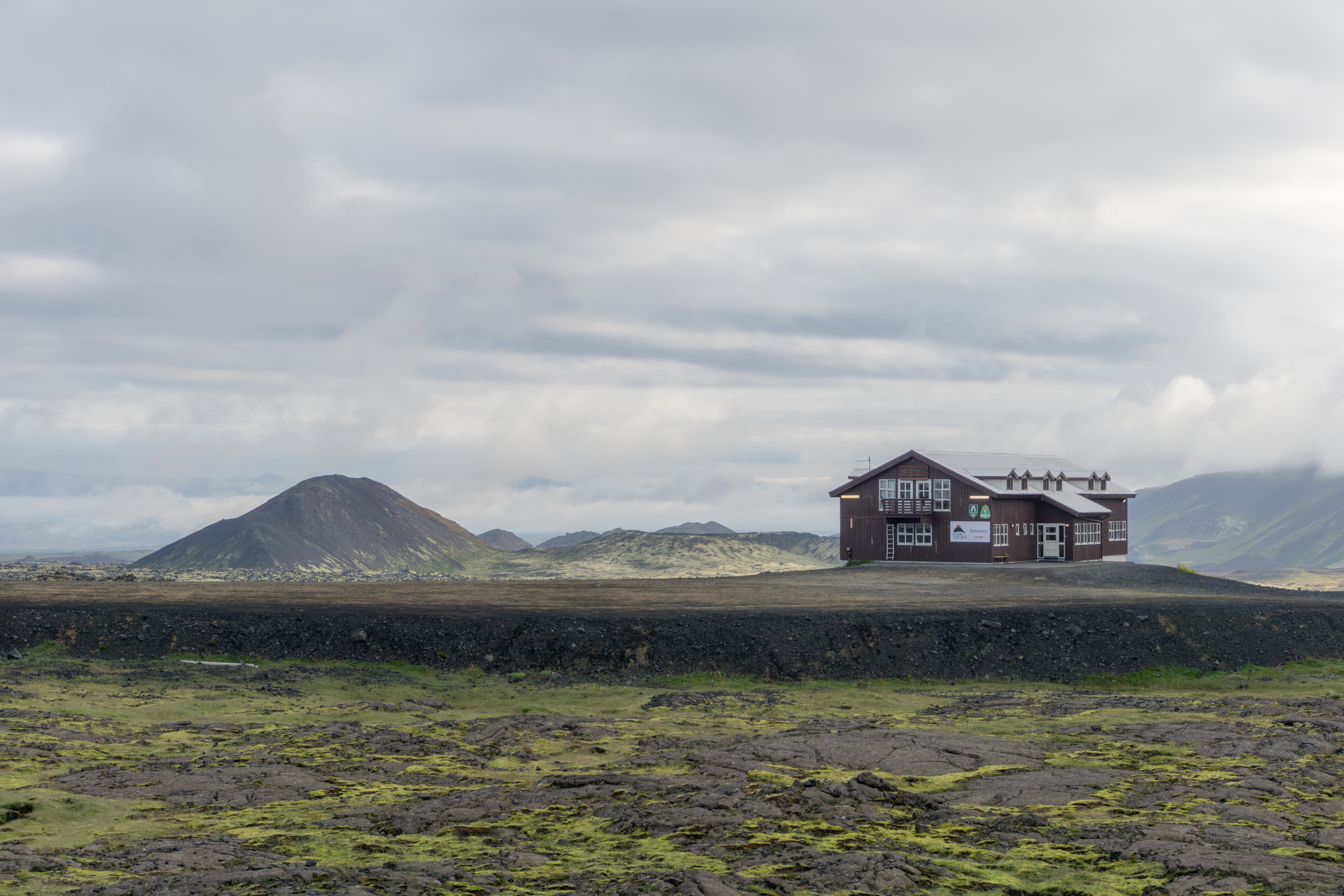
- Eldborg í Bláfjöllum with Drottning and Stóra-Kóngsfell from a hut at hiking trail Reykjavegur

Highest point
- Coordinates: 63.998°N 21.636°W

Naming
- English translation: Scoria Cone in the Blue Mountains
- Language of name: Icelandic

Geography
- Location within Iceland
- Location: Iceland

Geology
- Rock age: Holocene
- Mountain type: Scoria cone
- Last eruption: historical, around the year 1000

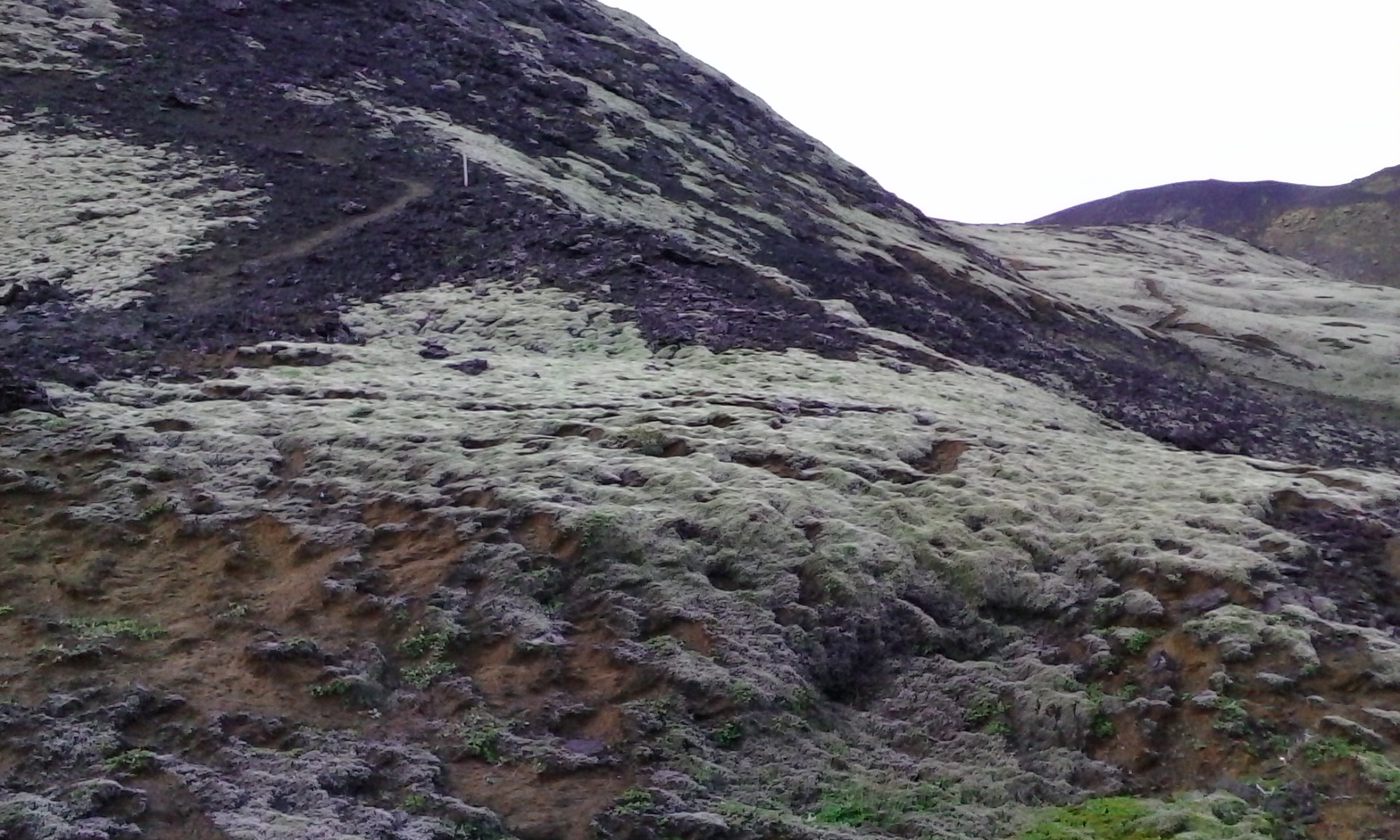
Slopes of Eldborg with hiking trail

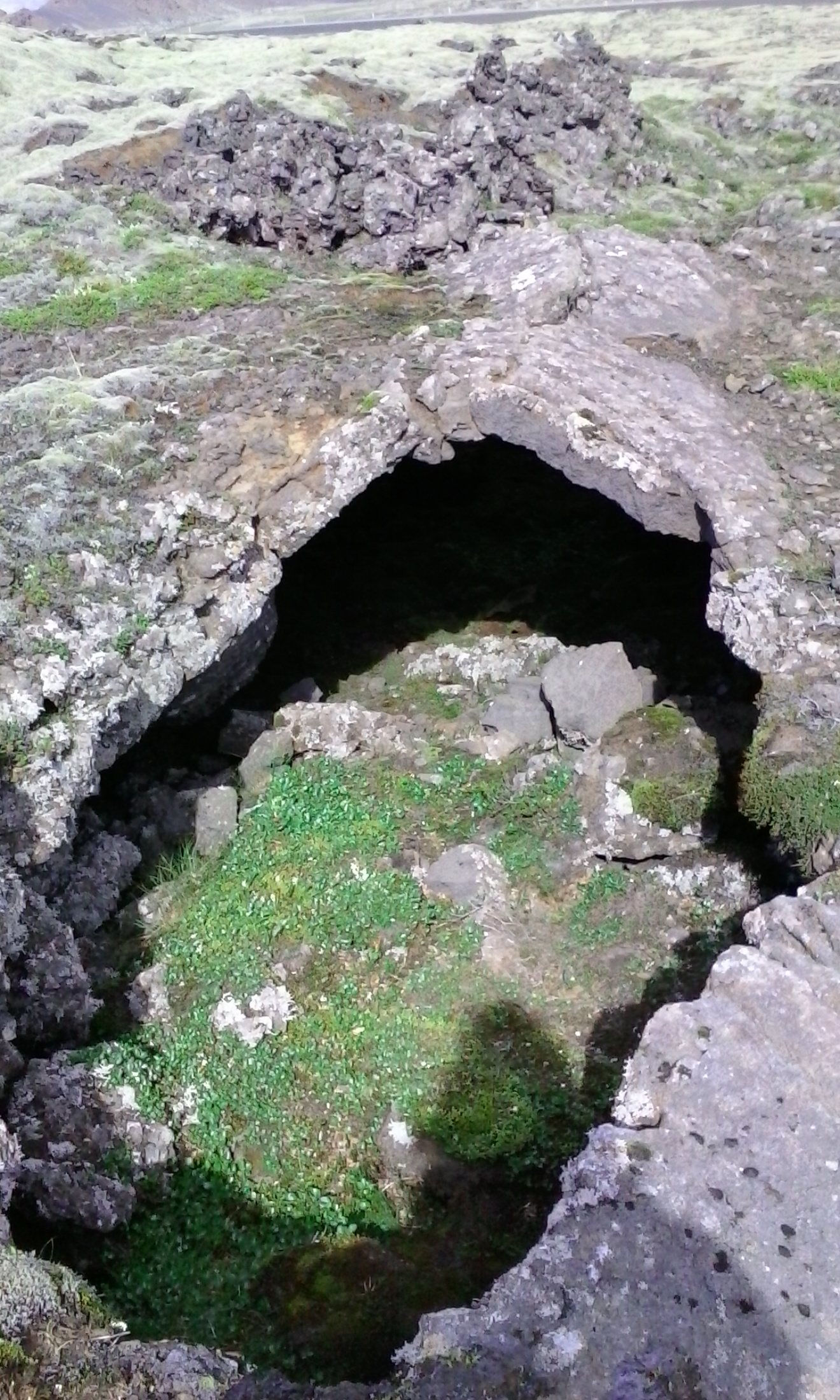
Skylight of a lava tube near Eldborg

The volcanic cone of Eldborg í Bláfjöllum (Icelandic pronunciation: [ˈɛltˌpɔrk iː ˈplauːˌfjœtlʏm]) is to be found at about 2 km from the skiing area in Bláfjöll, i.e. at about 25 km from Reykjavík, in Iceland.

== Scoria cones ==
Eldborg í Bláfjöllum is a scoria cone, part of a group of three such small volcanoes. The crater group as well as the impressive lava channels and tubes nearby are products of eruptions within the Brennisteinsfjöll volcanic system around the year 1000.

== Accessibility ==
Route 407 to the skiing area in Bláfjöll passes by the crater.

Some marked hiking trails connect the cone group of Eldborgir with the bigger mountains in the vicinity and other trails, e.g. the Reykjavegur Hiking Trail.

In the wintertime, cross country skiing is possible on cross-country ski-tracks in the area.

== Natural monument ==
Eldborg and its surroundings are protected as a natural monument inside the Bláfjalla Fólkvangur. since 1971.

The area of the Natural Monument is defined as: from the Road Bláfjallavegur, 200 m from the foot of the crater group to the southern foot of the mountain Drottning, over the ridge of this mountain to its northern tip and from there back to the road. This means that it is not allowed to walk around the area outside of the marked hiking trails neither to drive around in it or ride a horse within the area. Any construction work within the area needs permission.

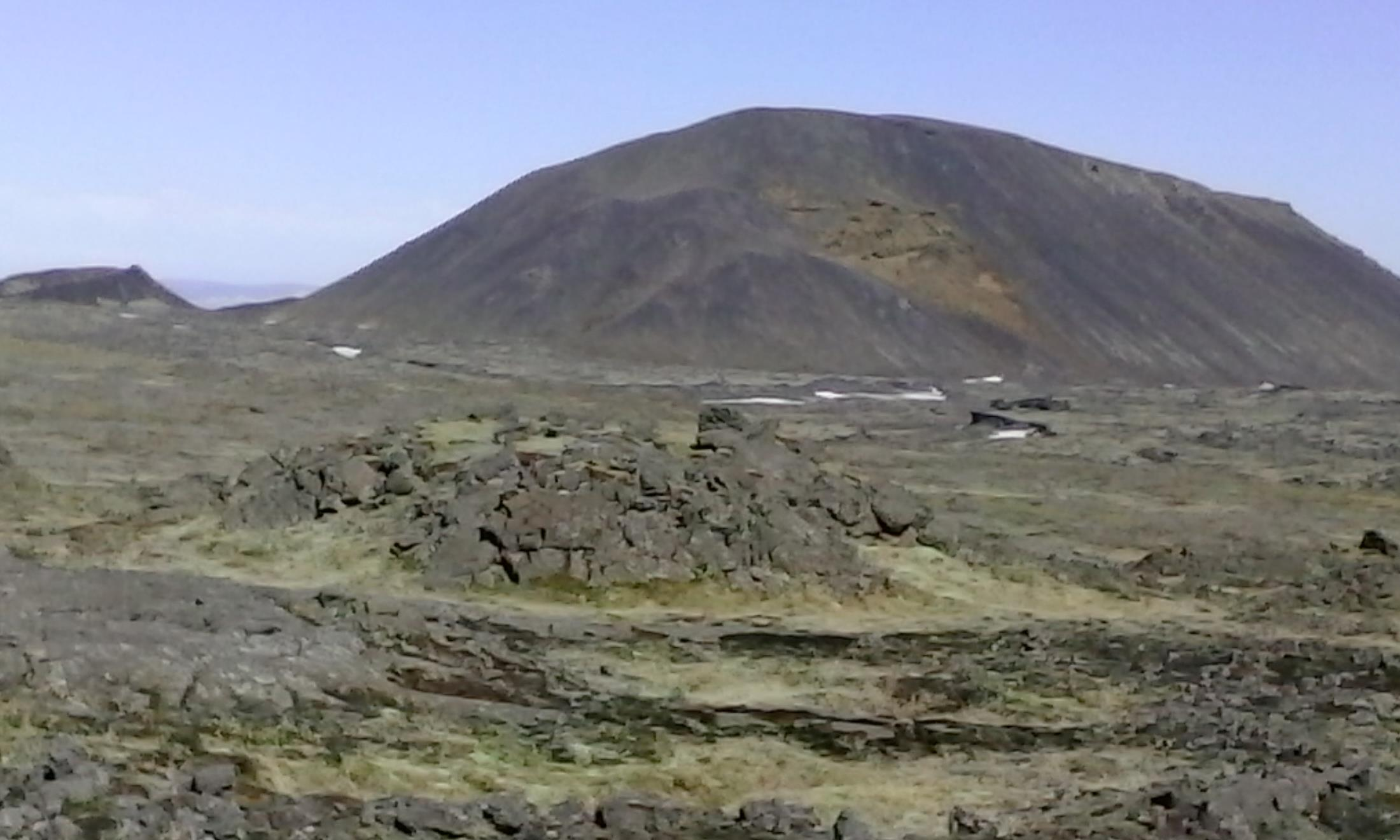
Stóra-Kóngsfell with volcanic landforms from historical times

== Stóra-Kóngsfell and Drottning ==
=== Subglacial mounds ===
Not far from the scoria cone group, two subglacial mounds are to be found, Stóra-Kóngsfell [ˈstouːra-ˌkʰouŋsˌfɛtl̥] (602 m) and Drottning [ˈtrɔhtniŋk] (410 m). They had their origin in eruptions under thick glaciers during the last glaciations.

=== Names ===
The names of these two mountains mean "Big King's-Mountain" (Stóra-Kóngsfell) and "Queen" (Drottning). They are explained by Þór Vigfússon: The area was once a highland area connected to some farmland down in the valley, in Seltjarnarhreppur and Álftaneshreppur, which was in the possession of the Danish king. For this reason, the bigger mountain was named Stóra-Kóngsfell. The smaller mountain in the vicinity was first called "Litla-Kóngsfell" ([ˈlɪhtla-] "Small King's-Mountain") by the farmers driving home their sheep in autumn, but the skiers of Bláfjöll called it "Drottning" (Queen), and this is now its official name.

=== Hiking ===
For hikers, who would like to go up on Stóra-Kóngsfell, it is best accessible from the south.

== See also ==
- Bláfjöll
- Stóra-Eldborg
