= Herdísarvík =

Small bay and abandoned farm in Iceland

Coordinates: 63°52′05″N 21°49′20″W

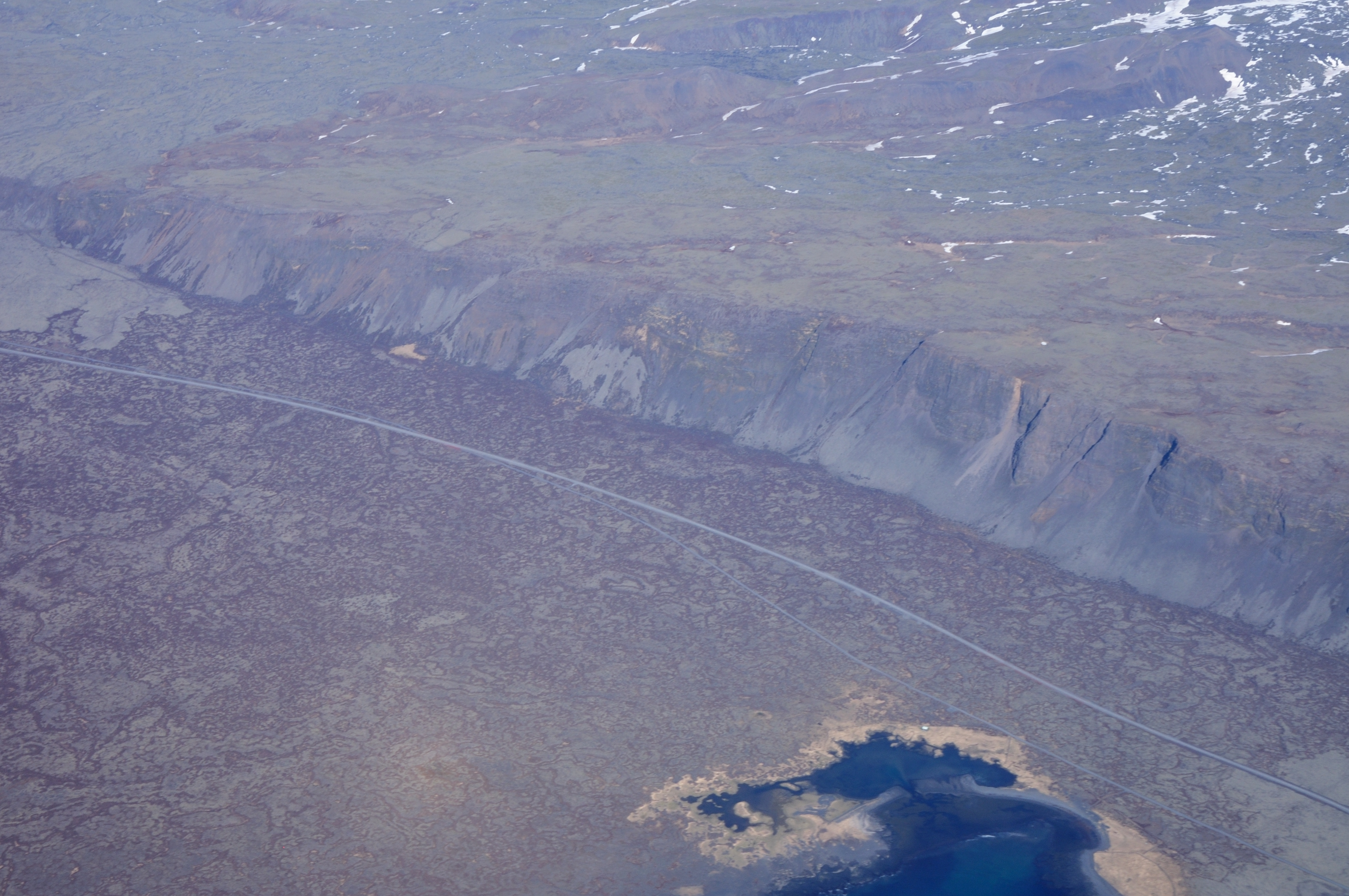
Aerial photograph of Herdísarvík and Herdísarvíkurfjall

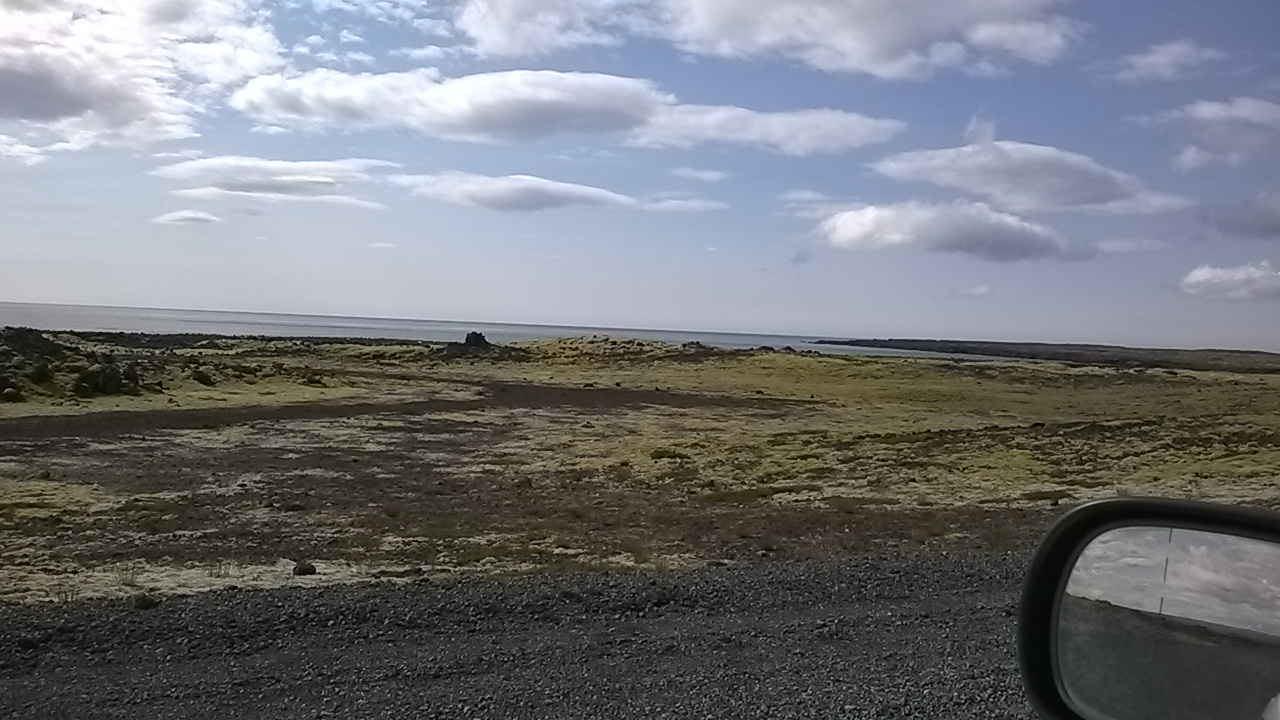
Herdísarvík in 2014

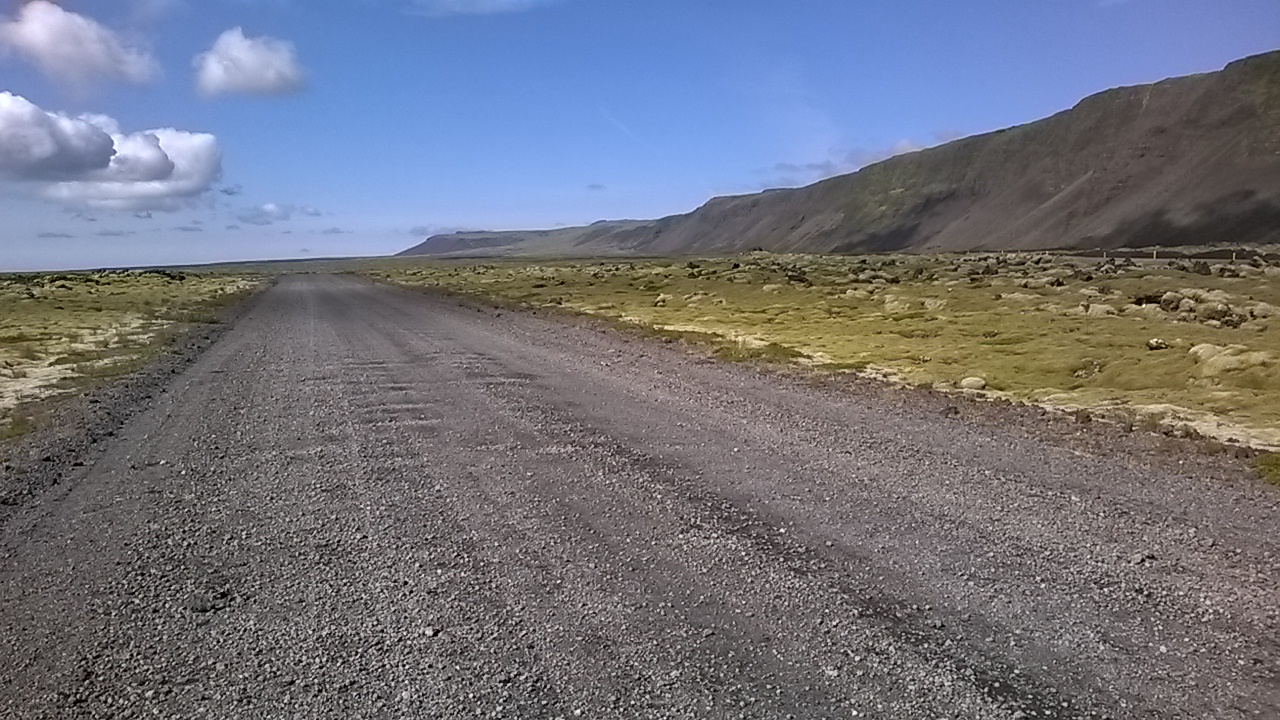
Herdísarvíkurhraun and the old road 427 near Herdísarvík in 2014

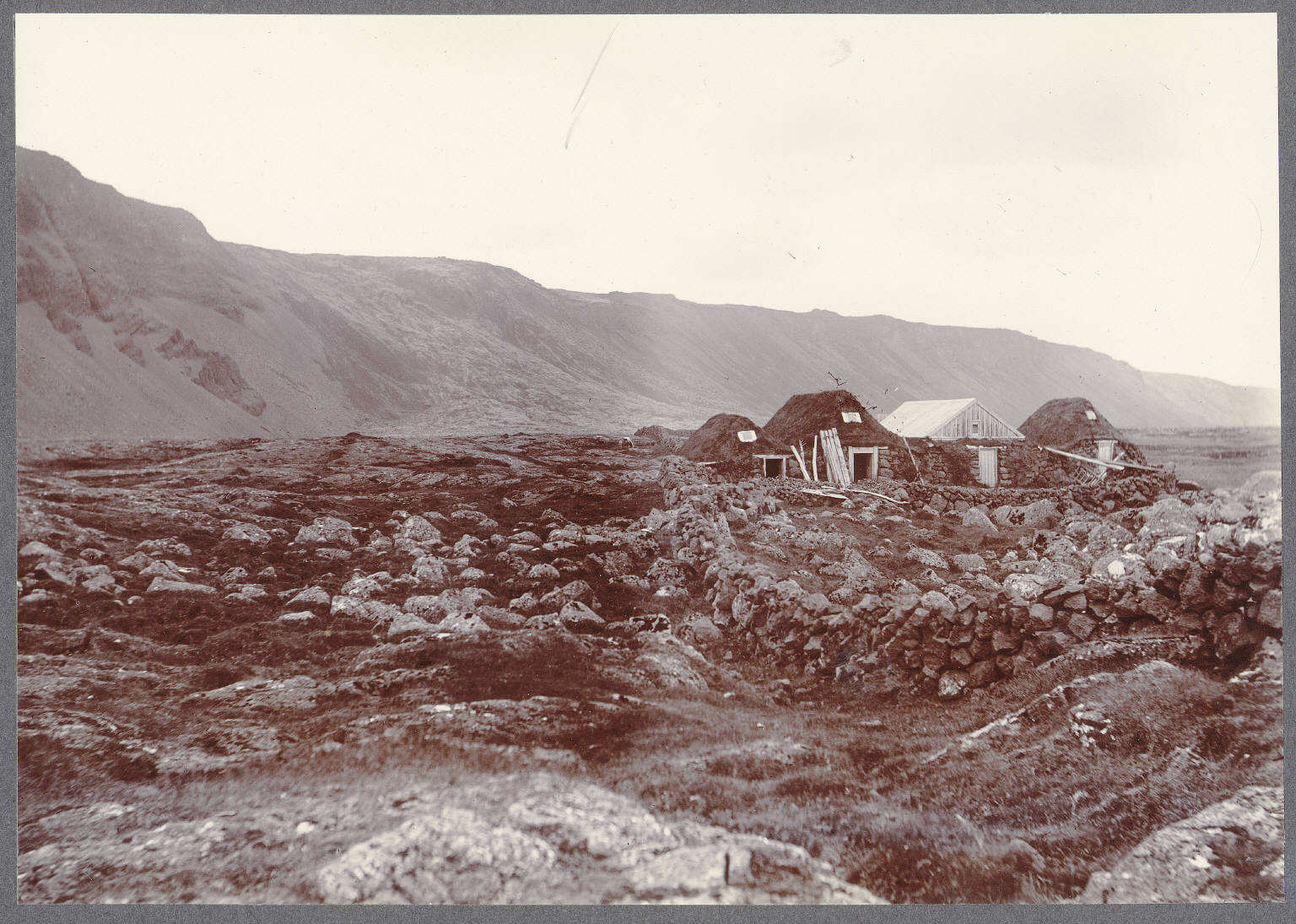
The old farm at Herdísarvík, lava falls behind, around 1900

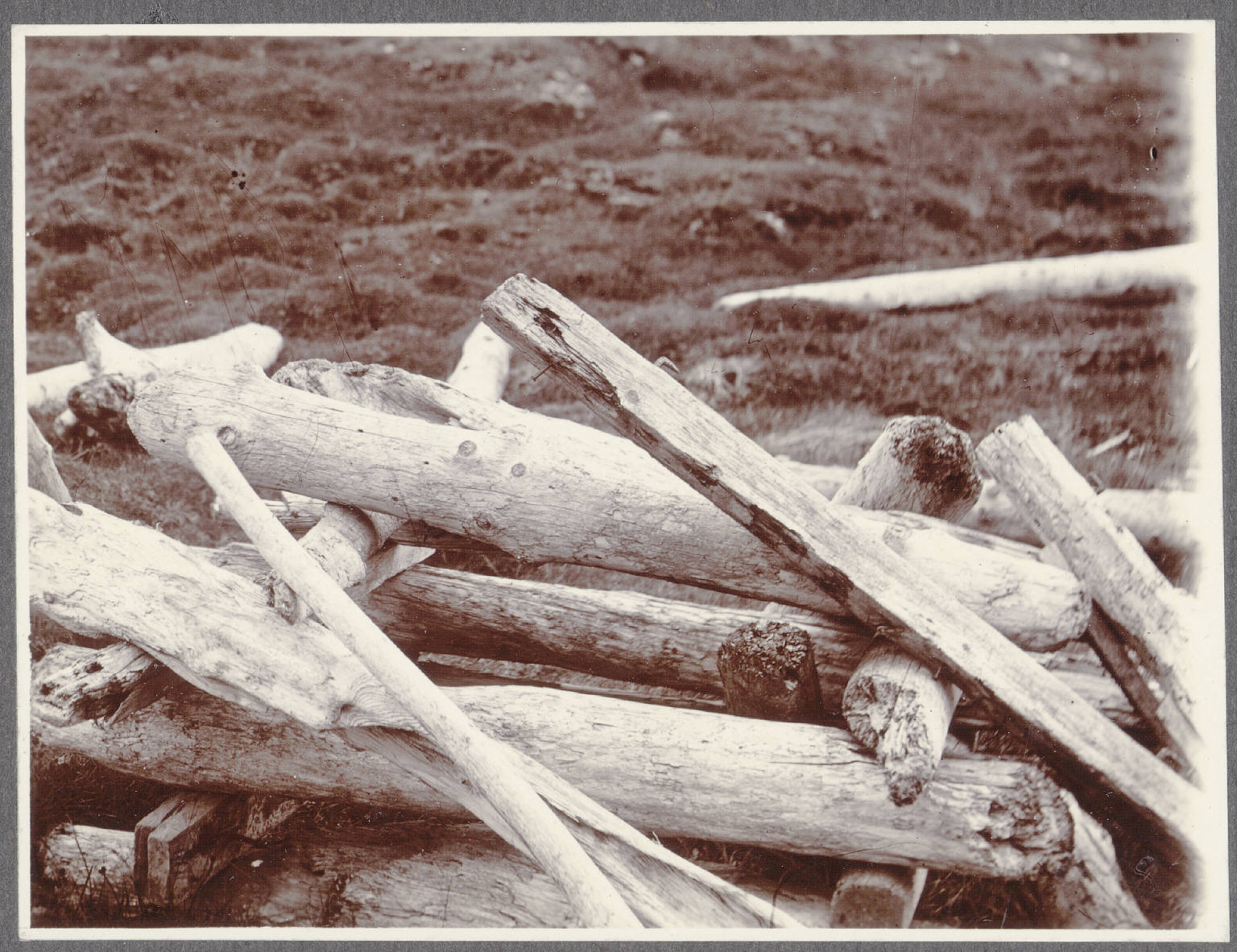
Drift wood in Herdísarvík (around 1900)

Herdísarvík (Icelandic pronunciation: [ˈhɛrˌtiːsarˌviːk]) is a small bay and abandoned farm by the same name at the south coast of Reykjanes in Gullbringusýsla, Iceland.

== Etymology ==
Herdísarvík means "bay of Herdís", a common Icelandic women's name, in this case the name of a folk tale figure from the region (see: Stóra-Eldborg).

== Location and access ==
Herdísarvík is situated at the foot of Herdísarvíkurfjall [-ˌviːkʏrˌfjatl̥]. The lava covering the land, Herdísarvíkurhraun [-ˌviːkʏr̥ˌr̥œiːn] came down from this volcanic mountain in the form of lava falls. These lava falls originate in craters of the Brennisteinsfjöll volcanic system.

Today, Route 427 passes near Herdísarvík. For a long time, the area was only accessible on foot, on horseback, or by small boats, in part due to the lava reefs in the water.

== History ==
=== Winter fishing ===
Since the Middle Ages, many Icelanders went to the coasts in the wintertime to go fishing. This was also done at the Reykjanes coast, where until around 1925, fishermen went out in rowing boats from different places at the south coast of Reykjanes to get herring or cod.

Herdísarvík had a landing for small boats. This was used in special weathers by people from Þórlákshöfn og Selvogur around Strandarkirkja for the transport of goods for the farms in the region.

Around 1900, new constructions were erected for winter fishing. Winter fishing was practiced with rowing boats until the 1920s. The remains of the huts and small walls for fish drying can still be seen around Herdísarvík today.

=== Farming ===
For some centuries, the farm at this place even had a reputation for being rather rich. There was good land down by the sea, but also up in the mountains for sheep pasture. Since the farm was situated on the coast, additional income came from hunting of seabirds and seals, fishing, trout angling in the nearby small lake (today a lagoon), and large quantities of drift wood - which were valuable due to a scarcity of trees.

=== Einar Benediktsson and Hlín Johnson in Herdísarvík ===
Einar Benediktsson (1864-1940), an author and early promoter of the installation of power stations and heavy industry in Iceland, and his wife Hlín Johnson (Jónsdóttir) arrived in 1932 to live here for the last years of Benediktsson's life. He was getting old and preferred the stillness and remoteness of this place to the stressful life in Reykjavík or bigger cities. Benediktsson died in Herdísarvík on January 12th, 1940.

Johnson continued running the farm after the death of Benediktsson. Johnson sold ice from the small lake to fishermen from Iceland and the Faroe Islands. People from Selvogur came often to the area to make hay or get ice in the winter. There was not a phone connection until 1945, neither a road before 1948. Johnson allowed construction of a road against the lava field Ögmundarhraun for transport of sheep and hay to Grindavík.

=== University of Iceland ===
Today, the land is owned by the Háskóli Íslands (University of Iceland), which received it as a donation from Einar Benediktsson.
