= Thrihnukagigur =

Volcano in Iceland

Coordinates: 63°59′54″N 21°41′56″W

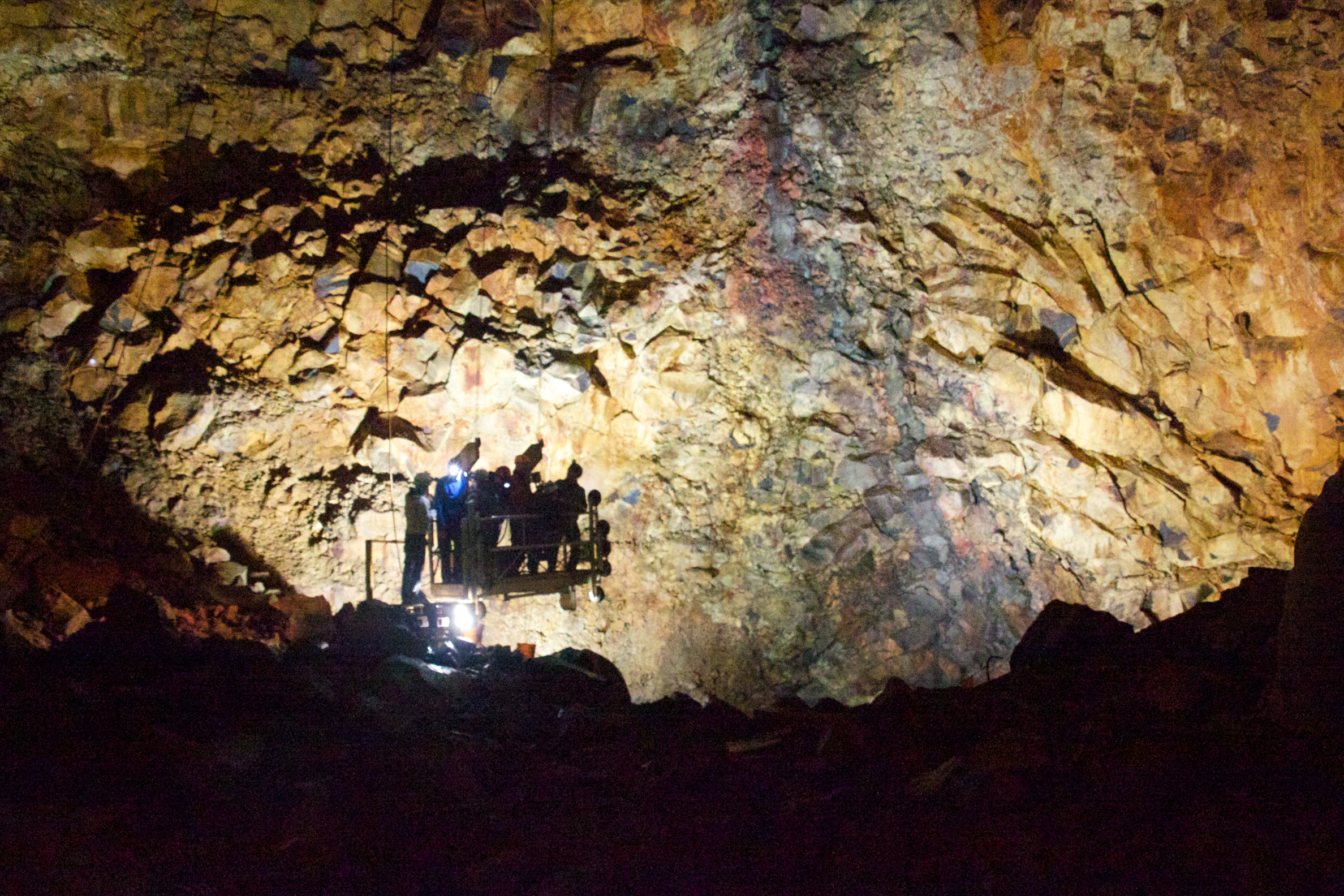
Inside the magma chamber

Þríhnúkagígur (Icelandic pronunciation: [ˈθriːˈn̥uːkaˈciːɣʏr̥], anglicized as Thrihnukagigur, literally translated as Three Peaks Crater) is a dormant volcano in the volcanic system of Brennisteinsfjöll near Reykjavík, Iceland. Covering a 3,270 square metres (35,200 sq ft) area and a depth of 213 meters (699 ft), it has not erupted in the past 4000 years. It was discovered in 1974 by cave explorer Árni B. Stefánsson, and opened for tourism in 2012. It is the only volcano in the world where visitors can take an elevator and safely descend into the magma chamber. The magma that filled the chamber has drained away, revealing the void beneath the surface.

In August 2015, the members of the Icelandic band Kaleo and fourteen support staff descended into the volcano's magma chamber and recorded a live rendition of the band's song "Way Down We Go".

In 2016, the Secret Solstice music festival announced that alternative rock musician Chino Moreno of Deftones will perform the first ever public concert inside the magma chamber of a volcano.

== Access ==
The "Inside the Volcano" tour of the magma chamber is the only tour of the magma chamber that is available to the general public. The tour operated by 3H Travel.

== Gallery ==
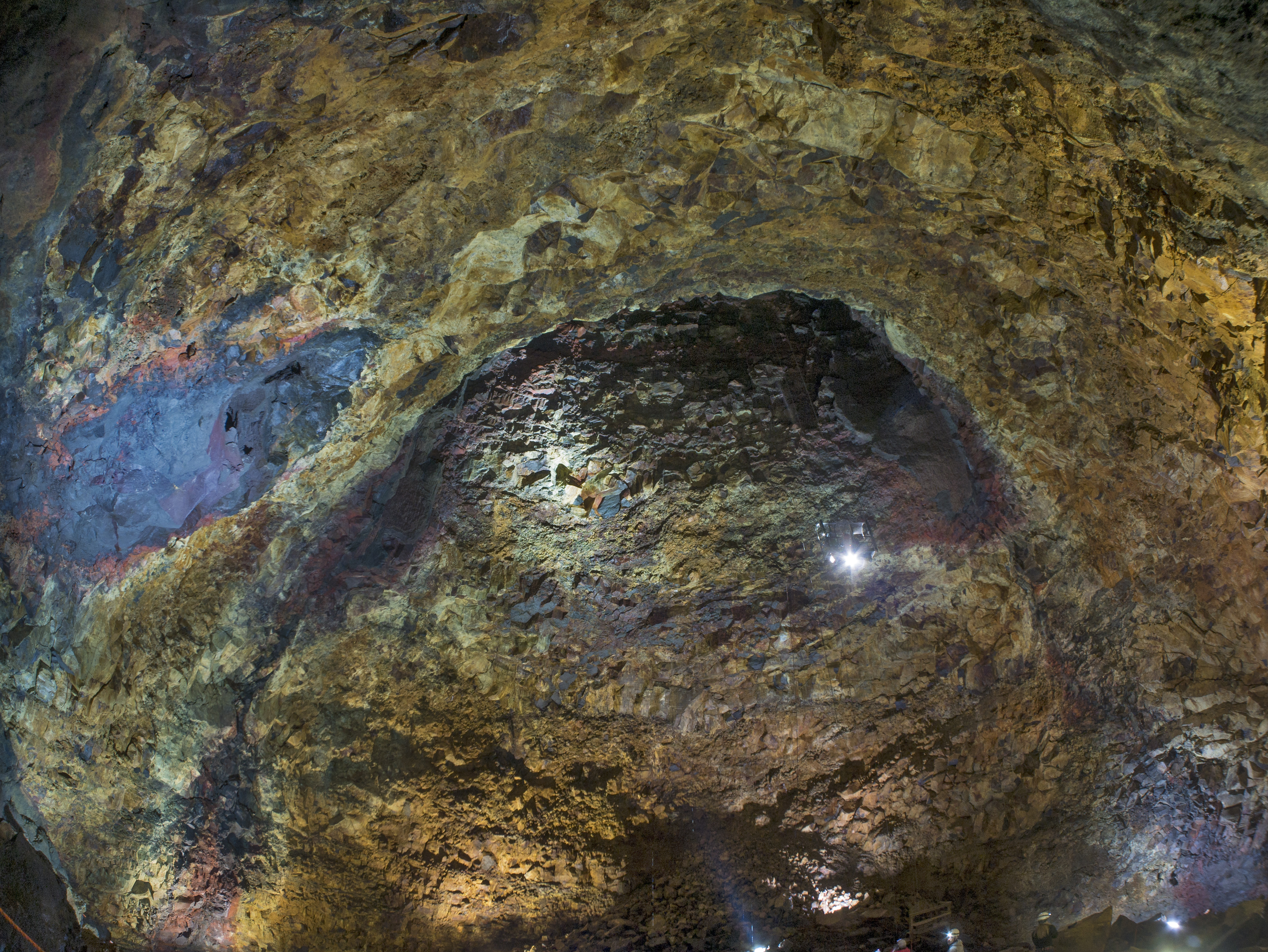
Inside the former magma chamber of Thrihnukagigur in Iceland.

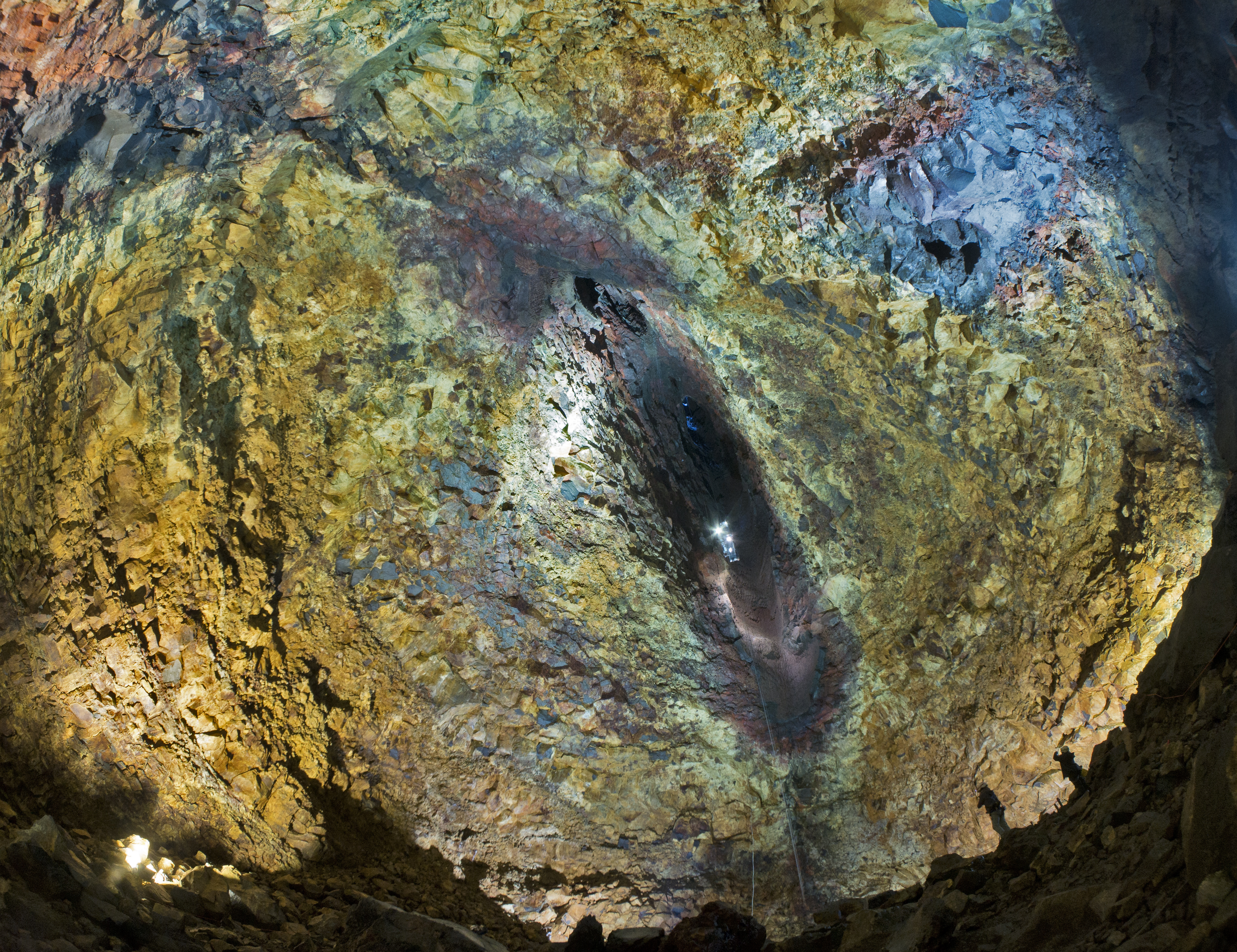
Looking up the volcanic throat of Thrihnukagigur in Iceland, an open volcanic conduit, from the former magma chamber.

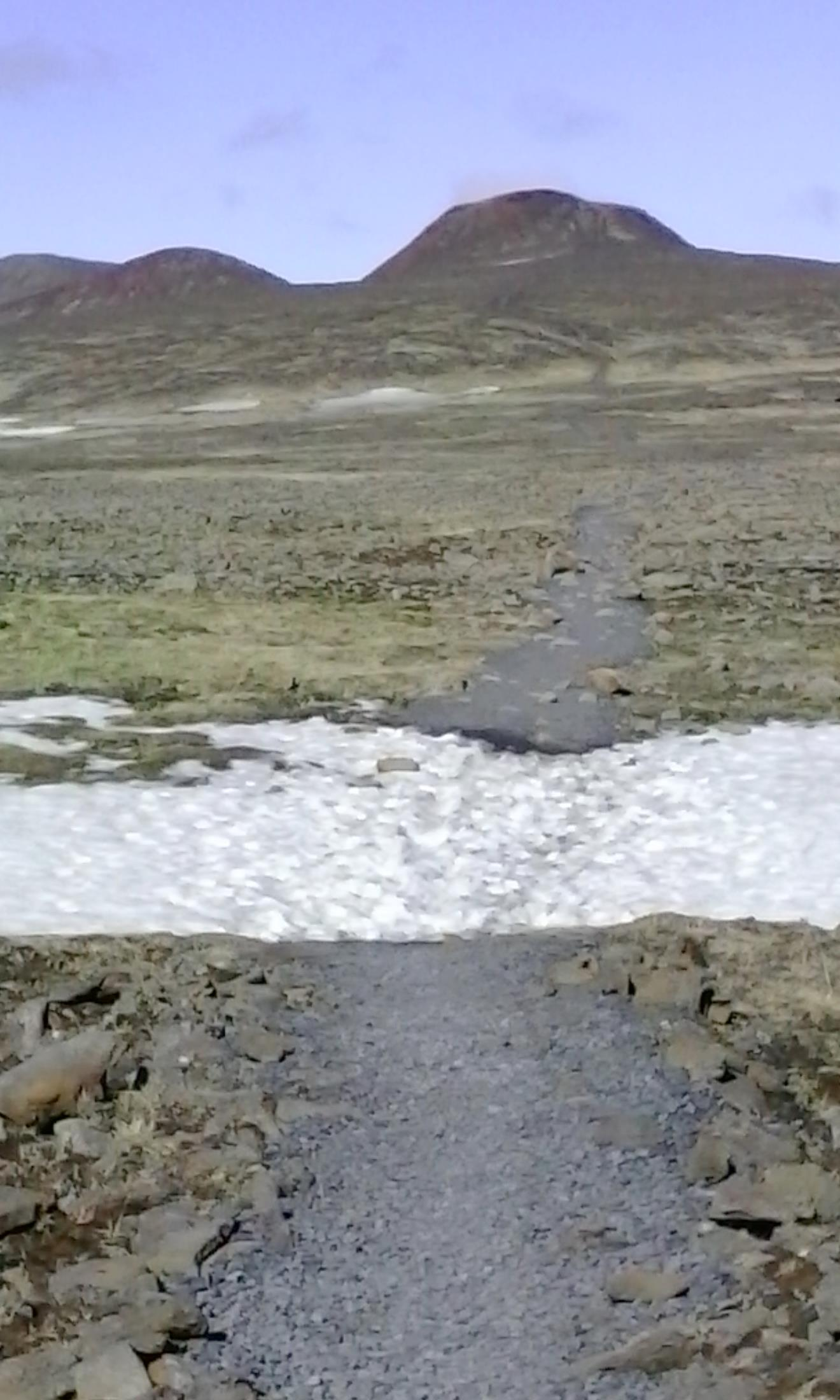
Hiking trail to Thrihnukagígur

== See also ==
- Volcanism of Iceland
  - List of volcanic eruptions in Iceland
  - List of volcanoes in Iceland
