= Way Down We Go =

2015 song by Kaleo

Single by Kaleo

from the album A/B
- Released: 7 August 2015
- Studio: CRC (Chicago)
- Genre: Blues rock
- Length: 3:39
- Label: Elektra; Atlantic
- Songwriter: JJ Julius Son
- Producers: Kaleo; Mike Crossey

Kaleo singles chronology
"All the Pretty Girls" (2015)	"Way Down We Go" (2015)	"No Good" (2016)

Music video
- "Way Down We Go" on YouTube

"Way Down We Go" is a song by Icelandic rock band Kaleo, released as the second single for their second studio album A/B by Elektra Records and Atlantic Records.

== Commercial performance ==
"Way Down We Go" peaked at No. 1 on Billboard's Alternative Songs and Rock Airplay charts.

== Live performances ==
A live performance of the song was recorded in the magma chamber of the dormant Icelandic volcano Thrihnukagigur.

== Charts ==
=== Weekly charts ===
Chart (2016–2017)	Peak position
Australia (ARIA)	30
Austria (Ö3 Austria Top 40)	10
Belarus Airplay (Eurofest)	8
Belgium (Ultratop 50 Flanders)	8
Belgium (Ultratop 50 Wallonia)	44
Canada Hot 100 (Billboard)	60
Canada Rock (Billboard)	6
CIS Airplay (TopHit)	2
Czech Republic Airplay (ČNS IFPI)	4
Czech Republic Singles Digital (ČNS IFPI)	55
Euro Digital Song Sales (Billboard)	14
France (SNEP)	4
Germany (GfK)	6
Greece (IFPI Greece)	1
Hungary (Rádiós Top 40)	6
Hungary (Single Top 40)	14
Ireland (IRMA)	98
Portugal (AFP)	86
Romania TV Airplay (Media Forest)	9
Russia Airplay (TopHit)	4
Scotland Singles (OCC)	42
Slovakia Airplay (ČNS IFPI)	31
Slovakia Singles Digital (ČNS IFPI)	56
Slovenia (SloTop50)	8
Spain (Promusicae)	14
Switzerland (Schweizer Hitparade)	10
UK Singles (OCC)	96
US Billboard Hot 100	54
US Adult Pop Airplay (Billboard)	18
US Hot Rock & Alternative Songs (Billboard)	5
US Pop Airplay (Billboard)	36
US Rock & Alternative Airplay (Billboard)	1

Chart (2025–2026)	Peak position
Iceland (Billboard)	3

=== Year-end charts ===
Chart (2016)	Position
Belgium (Ultratop Flanders)	92
US Hot Rock Songs (Billboard)	20
US Rock Airplay (Billboard)	4

Chart (2017)	Position
Austria (Ö3 Austria Top 40)	60
Belgium (Ultratop Flanders)	87
CIS (Tophit)	4
France (SNEP)	51
Germany (Official German Charts)	61
Hungary (Rádiós Top 40)	98
Hungary (Single Top 40)	75
Russia Airplay (Tophit)	1
Slovenia (SloTop50)	44
Spain Airplay (PROMUSICAE)	11
Switzerland (Schweizer Hitparade)	28
Ukraine Airplay (Tophit)	25
US Hot Rock Songs (Billboard)	13
US Rock Airplay (Billboard)	20

== Certifications ==
Region	Certification	Certified units/sales
Australia (ARIA)	5× Platinum	350,000^{‡}
Austria (IFPI Austria)	Platinum	30,000^{‡}
Belgium (BRMA)	Gold	10,000^{‡}
Canada (Music Canada)	9× Platinum	720,000^{‡}
Denmark (IFPI Danmark)	Platinum	90,000^{‡}
France (SNEP)	Diamond	333,333^{‡}
Germany (BVMI)	Platinum	400,000^{‡}
Italy (FIMI)	Platinum	70,000^{‡}
New Zealand (RMNZ)	5× Platinum	150,000^{‡}
Poland (ZPAV)	4× Platinum	200,000^{‡}
Portugal (AFP)	Platinum	20,000^{‡}
Spain (Promusicae)	Platinum	60,000^{‡}
United Kingdom (BPI)	2× Platinum	1,200,000^{‡}
United States (RIAA)	2× Platinum	2,000,000^{‡}
^{‡} Sales+streaming figures based on certification alone.

== Release history ==
Region	Date	Format	Label
United States	4 October 2016	Mainstream radio	Elektra; Atlantic

== Appearances in other media ==
The song was used in the movie Collateral Beauty, in a trailer for the movie Logan, in the trailer for the fourth season of Orange Is the New Black, as well as the shows Suits, Supergirl, Manifest, The Walking Dead, The Blacklist, Notorious, Lucifer, Grey's Anatomy, Teen Wolf, Blindspot, Eyewitness, This Is Us, Frequency and The Vampire Diaries, and Ginny & Georgia, an advertisement for Boots UK, Riverdale, NCIS and Dolce & Gabbana and was featured in the sports video games FIFA 16 and FIFA 23. A remix of the song was also played by EDM artist Lost Frequencies during his set at Tomorrowland in 2018, and DJIDJIT during his backyard live set in 2024. It is also available as DLC for the game Rocksmith 2014.
