= Jökull Júlíusson =

Icelandic singer-songwriter

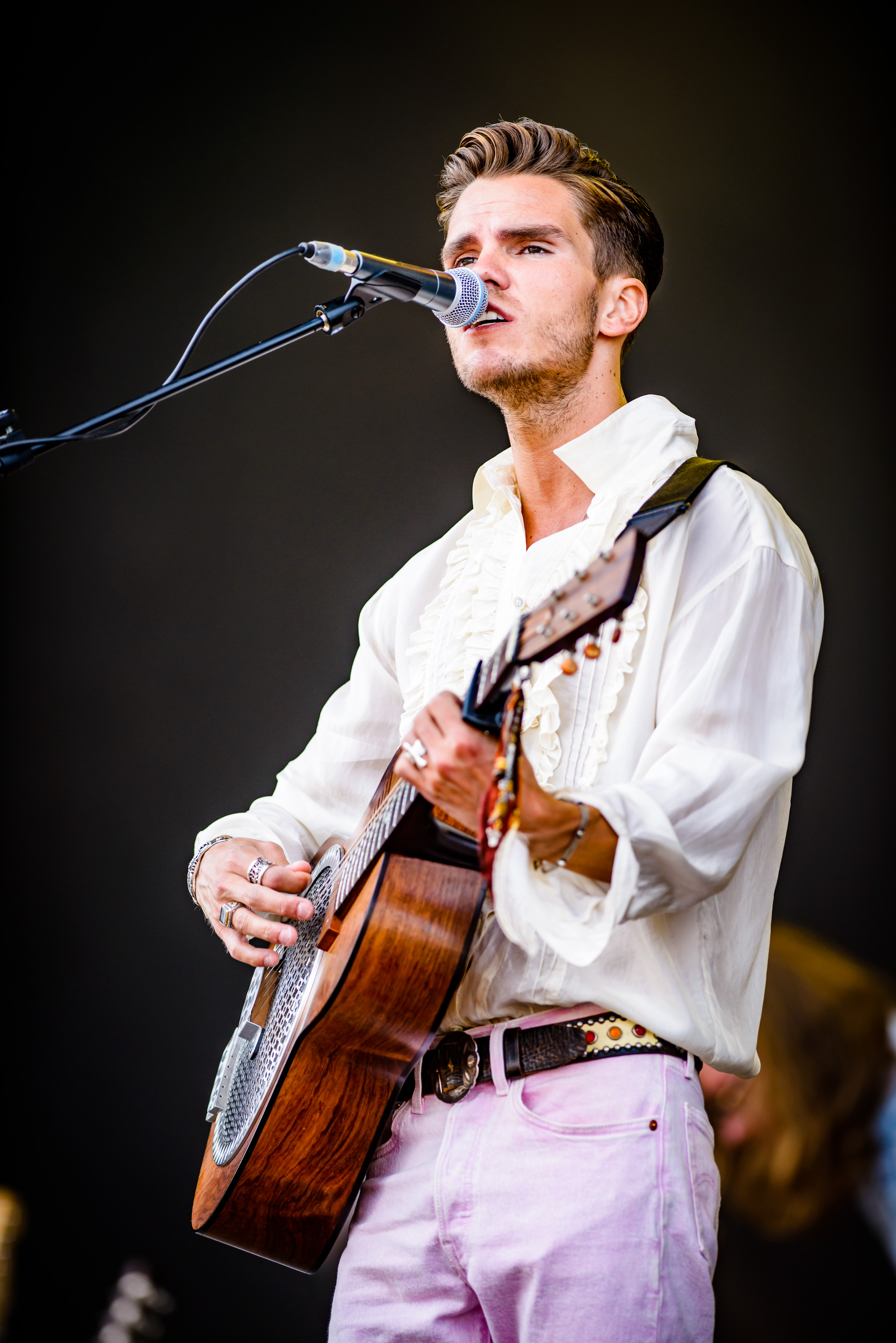
- Jökull Júlíusson at Rock am Ring 2018

Background information
- Born: 20 March 1990 (age 35); Reykjavík, Iceland
- Genres: Blues rock
- Occupations: Singer; songwriter
- Instrument: Guitar
- Years active: 2012–present
- Member of: Kaleo

Jökull Júlíusson (born 20 March 1990) is an Icelandic singer-songwriter, best known as the lead singer of Kaleo. He gained national fame for covering the song "Vor í Vaglaskógi" with Kaleo in 2013.

== Early life ==
Jökull was born in Reykjavík and spent his first years there and in Mosfellsbær. At the age of six, he moved with his family to Höfn before moving to Denmark six years later. The family returned to Mosfellsbær in 2004 and he finished his primary school education at Varmárskóli, where he met his future bandmates Davíð Antonsson and Daníel Ægir Kristjánsson. As a child, he learned the piano and taught himself to play the guitar. An avid football fan, he played for Sindri Höfn, TRIF and Afturelding's youth teams until the age of 16.

== Musical career ==
After primary school, he founded the band Timburmenn along with Davíð Antonsson and Daníel Ægir Kristjánsson which performed mostly covers. In 2009, he participated in Músíktilraunir with the band St. Peter the Leader. In 2012, he founded Kaleo, along with Davíð, Daníel and Rubin Pollock, ahead of the Iceland Airwaves music festival. In 2014, he won the 2013 Icelandic Audience Award Singer of the Year.

In 2017, he was admitted to hospital due to stress-related illness, forcing Kaleo to cancel several concerts.

In 2024, he appeared in the Sept. 27th episode of the CBS daytime soap opera, The Bold and the Beautiful playing himself.
