= A/B (album) =

Studio album by Kaleo
- Released: 10 June 2016
- Recorded: 2014–2015
- Studios: Blackbird (Nashville); Undertow (Nashville); Ocean Way (Nashville); Red Caiman (Pittsburgh); Livingston (London); Arlyn (Austin); Orb (Austin); Chicago Recording Company (Chicago); Capitol (Los Angeles); Henson (Los Angeles); C Blake (Newark, Delaware); Wrightway (Baltimore); Aeronaut (Reykjavík)
- Genres: Blues rock; garage rock
- Length: 42:17
- Label: Elektra
- Producers: Mike Crossey; Arnar Guðjónsson; Kaleo; Jacquire King

Kaleo chronology
| Kaleo (2013) | A/B (2016) | Surface Sounds (2021) |

Singles from A/B
- 1. "All the Pretty Girls" Released: 20 January 2015; 2. "Way Down We Go" Released: 7 August 2015; 3. "No Good" Released: 20 November 2015; 4. "I Can't Go On Without You" Released: 19 February 2016

A/B is the second studio album by Icelandic rock band Kaleo. It was released on June 10, 2016, through Elektra Records.

== Critical reception ==
Professional ratings
Review scores
| Source | Rating |
|---|---|
| AllMusic | Positive |
| The Guardian | 2/5 stars |
| PopMatters | 7/10 stars |
| Renowned for Sound | 4/5 stars |
| Rolling Stone | 3/5 stars |
| Sound Fiction | 4.5/5 stars |

A/B received generally favourable reviews from music critics, some of which praised Jökull Júlíusson's vocals, as well as the songs "No Good" and "All the Pretty Girls". Kate Hutchinson from The Guardian, however, thought it lacked originality, seeing the pieces as taking inspiration from the Black Keys ("Hot Blood"), James Bay ("Way Down We Go"), Bon Iver ("All the Pretty Girls") and Kings of Leon (much of the rest).

The track "Glass House" was featured in the soundtrack of Madden NFL 17 and as DLC for Rock Band 4. The track "Hot Blood" is featured in NHL 18, Far Cry 5 and Asphalt Legends Unite. The track "Way Down We Go" was featured in FIFA 16 and in the trailer for the 2017 film, Logan.

== Track listing ==
All tracks are written by JJ Julius Son, except where noted.

| No. | Title | Writer(s) | Length |
|---|---|---|---|
| 1. | "No Good" | | 3:55 |
| 2. | "Way Down We Go" | JJ Julius Son | 3:39 |
| 3. | "Broken Bones" | JJ Julius Son; Rubin Pollock | 4:05 |
| 4. | "Glass House" | | 4:01 |
| 5. | "Hot Blood" | | 3:38 |
| 6. | "All the Pretty Girls" | | 4:29 |
| 7. | "Automobile" | | 3:06 |
| 8. | "Vor í Vaglaskógi" | Jónas Jónasson; Kristján frá Djúpalæk | 4:37 |
| 9. | "Save Yourself" | | 4:33 |
| 10. | "I Can't Go on Without You" | | 6:14 |

== Charts ==
=== Weekly charts ===
2016–2018 weekly chart performance for A/B
| Chart (2016–2018) | Peak position |
|---|---|
| Australian Albums (ARIA) | 29 |
| Austrian Albums (Ö3 Austria) | 27 |
| Belgian Albums (Ultratop Flanders) | 21 |
| Belgian Albums (Ultratop Wallonia) | 31 |
| Canadian Albums (Billboard) | 2 |
| French Albums (SNEP) | 28 |
| German Albums (Offizielle Top 100) | 9 |
| Hungarian Albums (MAHASZ) | 19 |
| Icelandic Albums (Tónlistinn) | 4 |
| Irish Albums (IRMA) | 17 |
| Latvian Albums (LaIPA) | 56 |
| New Zealand Albums (RMNZ) | 15 |
| Swiss Albums (Schweizer Hitparade) | 6 |
| UK Albums (Official Charts) | 27 |
| US Billboard 200 | 16 |
| US Top Rock Albums (Billboard) | 4 |

2025 weekly chart performance for A/B
| Chart (2025) | Peak position |
|---|---|
| Norwegian Rock Albums (IFPI Norge) | 19 |

=== Year-end charts ===
2016 year-end chart performance for A/B
| Chart (2016) | Position |
|---|---|
| Icelandic Albums (Tónlistinn) | 1 |
| US Top Rock Albums (Billboard) | 42 |

2017 year-end chart performance for A/B
| Chart (2017) | Position |
|---|---|
| Belgian Albums (Ultratop Flanders) | 96 |
| Belgian Albums (Ultratop Wallonia) | 133 |
| French Albums (SNEP) | 115 |
| German Albums (Offizielle Top 100) | 97 |
| Icelandic Albums (Tónlistinn) | 3 |
| Swiss Albums (Schweizer Hitparade) | 59 |
| US Top Rock Albums (Billboard) | 50 |

2018 year-end chart performance for A/B
| Chart (2018) | Position |
|---|---|
| Icelandic Albums (Tónlistinn) | 16 |

2019 year-end chart performance for A/B
| Chart (2019) | Position |
|---|---|
| Icelandic Albums (Tónlistinn) | 19 |

2020 year-end chart performance for A/B
| Chart (2020) | Position |
|---|---|
| Icelandic Albums (Tónlistinn) | 16 |

2021 year-end chart performance for A/B
| Chart (2021) | Position |
|---|---|
| Icelandic Albums (Tónlistinn) | 6 |

2022 year-end chart performance for A/B
| Chart (2022) | Position |
|---|---|
| Icelandic Albums (Tónlistinn) | 11 |

2023 year-end chart performance for A/B
| Chart (2023) | Position |
|---|---|
| Icelandic Albums (Tónlistinn) | 12 |

2024 year-end chart performance for A/B
| Chart (2024) | Position |
|---|---|
| Icelandic Albums (Tónlistinn) | 18 |

2025 year-end chart performance for A/B
| Chart (2025) | Position |
|---|---|
| Icelandic Albums (Tónlistinn) | 14 |

== Certifications ==
Certifications and sales for A/B
| Region | Certification | Certified units/sales |
|---|---|---|
| Austria (IFPI Austria) | Gold | 7,500^{*} |
| Canada (Music Canada) | 2× Platinum | 160,000^{‡} |
| Denmark (IFPI Danmark) | Platinum | 20,000^{‡} |
| France (SNEP) | Platinum | 100,000^{‡} |
| Germany (BVMI) | Gold | 100,000^{‡} |
| Iceland (FHF) | Platinum | 13,600 |
| Italy (FIMI) | Gold | 25,000^{‡} |
| New Zealand (RMNZ) | 2× Platinum | 30,000^{‡} |
| Norway (IFPI Norway) | Gold | 10,000^{‡} |
| Poland (ZPAV) | Platinum | 20,000^{‡} |
| United Kingdom (BPI) | Gold | 100,000^{‡} |
| United States (RIAA) | Platinum | 1,000,000^{‡} |
^{*} Sales figures based on certification alone.^{‡} Sales+streaming figures based on certification alone.
