= Brennisteinsfjöll =

Volcanic system in Iceland

Coordinates: 63°55′N 21°50′W

Selected geological features near the Brennisteinsfjöll volcanic system (approximate outline in red). Clicking on the image enables mouse-over with more detail where shading also shows: other '"`UNIQ--templatestyles-00000000-QINU`"' fissure swarms, '"`UNIQ--templatestyles-00000001-QINU`"' central volcanoes, '"`UNIQ--templatestyles-00000002-QINU`"' calderas '"`UNIQ--templatestyles-00000003-QINU`"' subglacial terrain above 1,100 m (3,600 ft), '"`UNIQ--templatestyles-00000004-QINU`"' seismically active areas between 1995 and 2007.

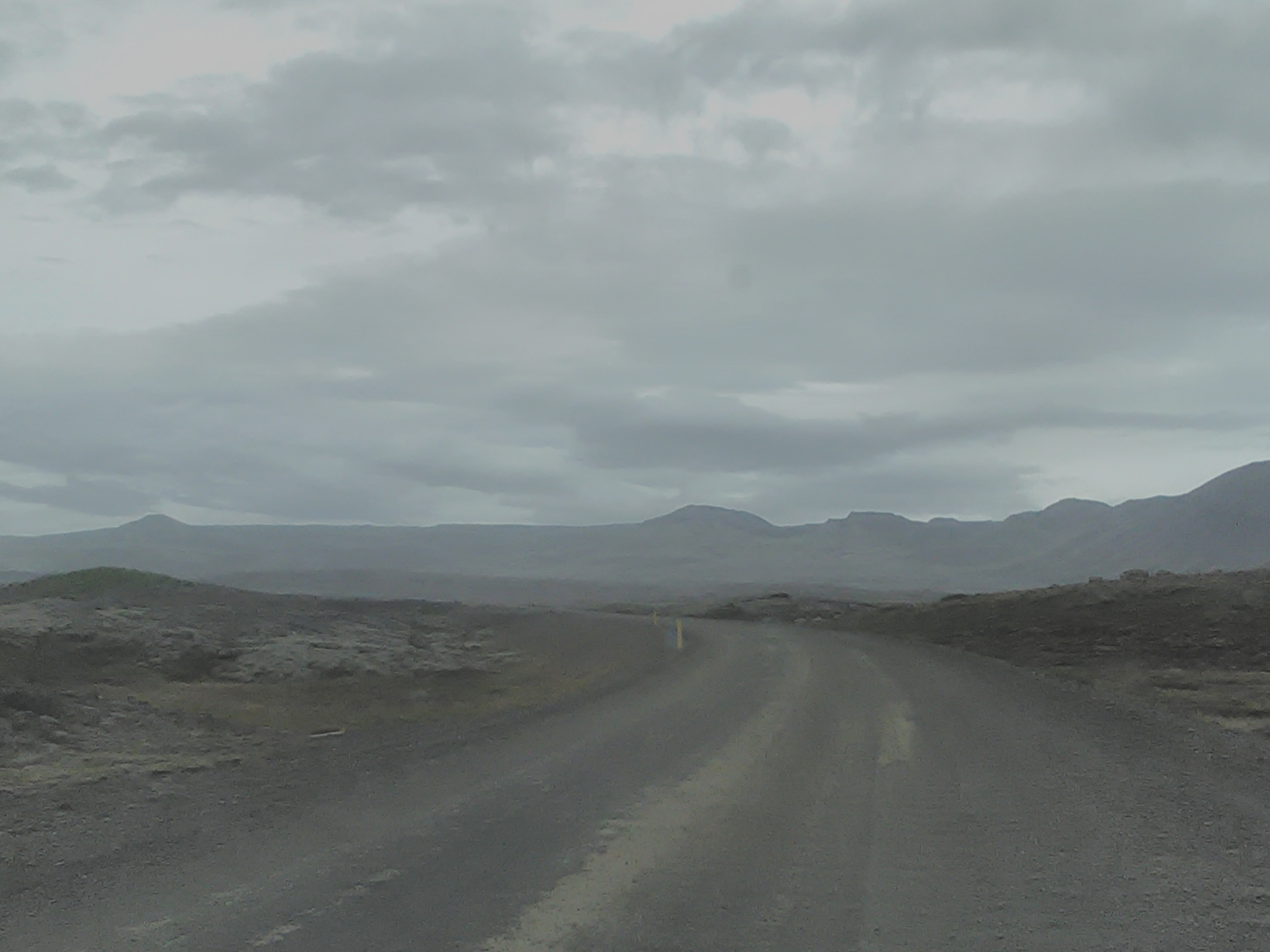
Brennisteinsfjöll from Route 417

Brennisteinsfjöll towards the south-east is one of the volcanic systems in Iceland

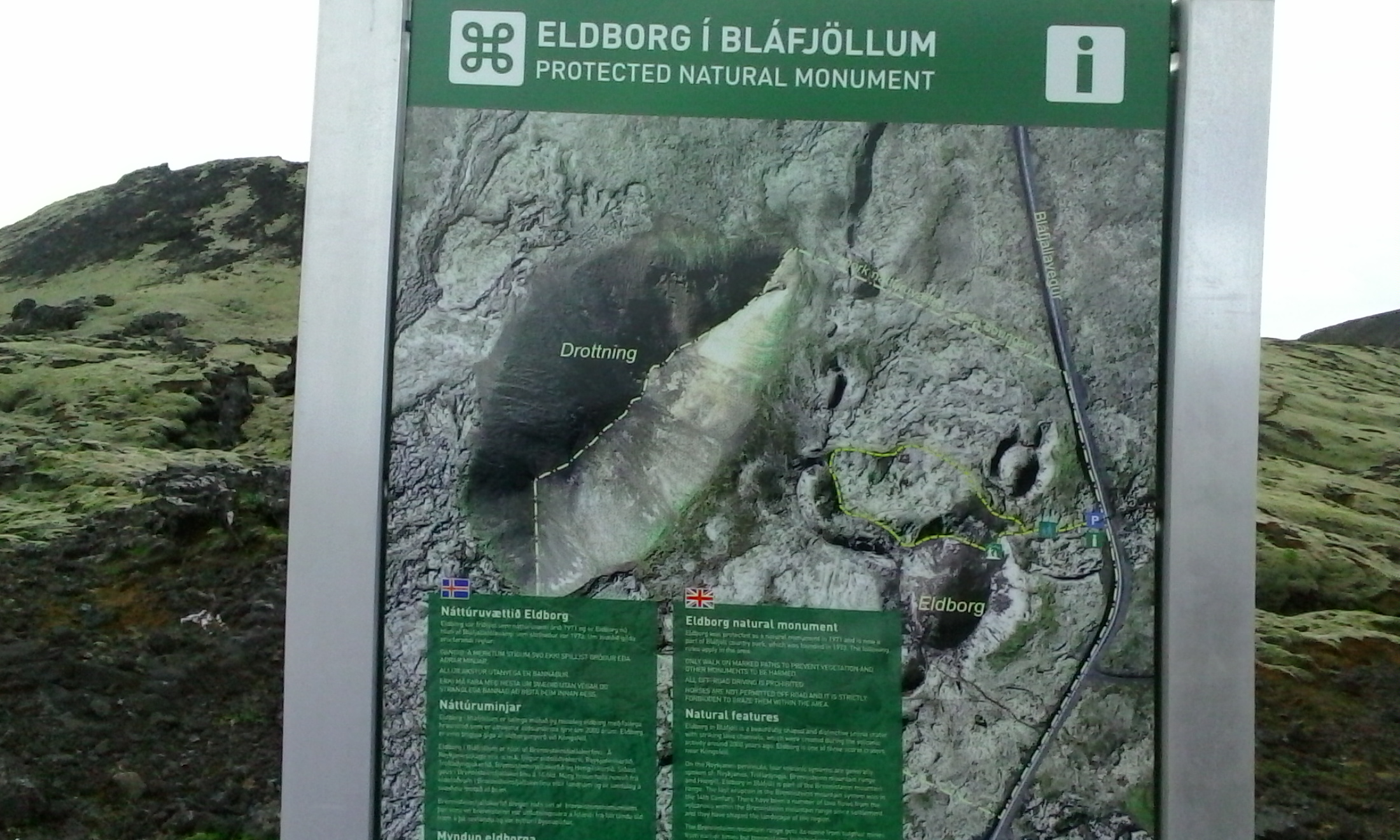
Map of the Bláfjöll region with different volcanic edifices

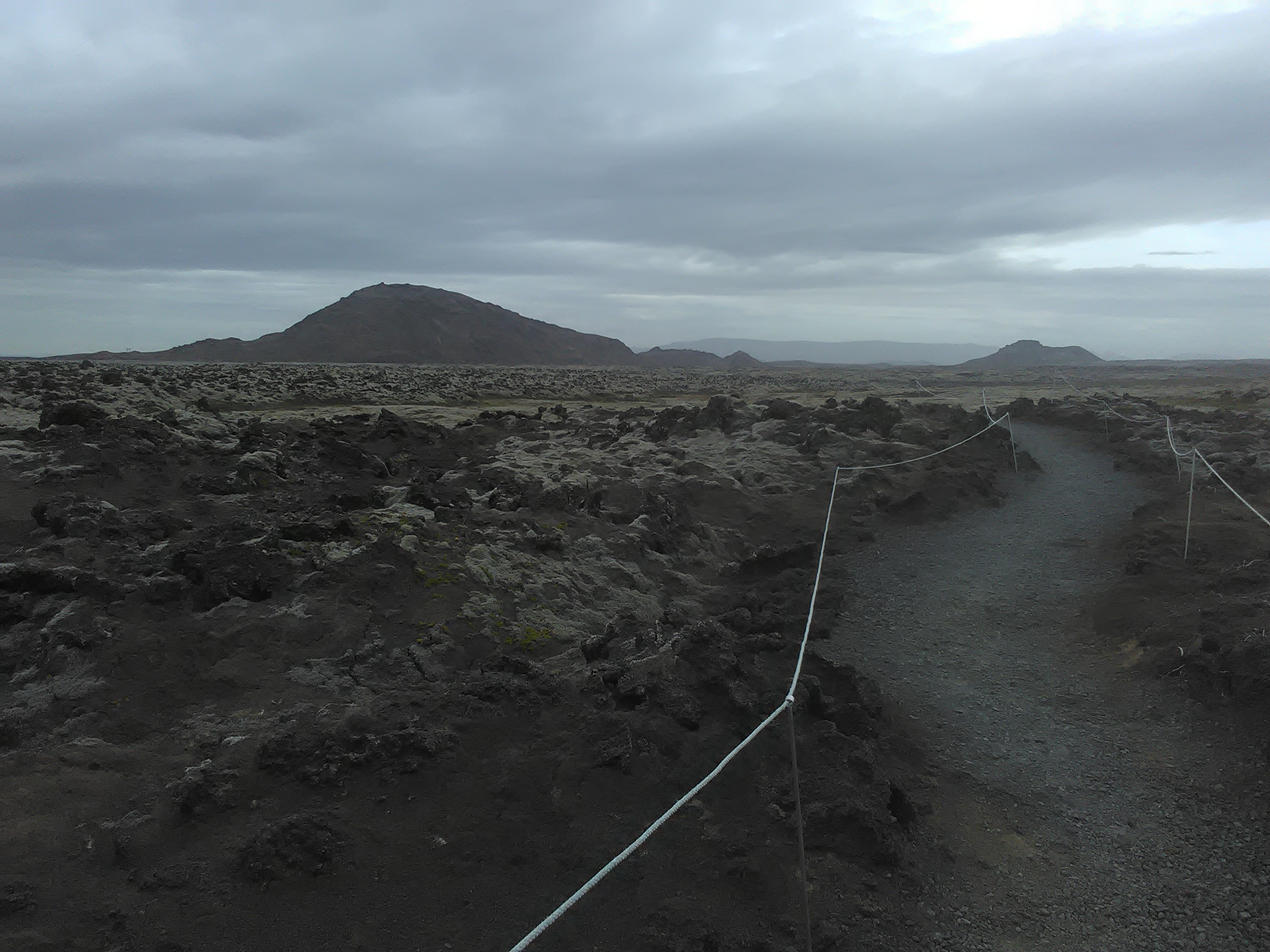
Lava fields of the Brennisteinsfjöll around Helgafell (Hafnarfjörður)

Brennisteinsfjöll (Icelandic pronunciation: [ˈprɛnːɪˌsteinsˌfjœtl̥], "Sulfur mountains") is a minor volcanic system, with crater rows and small shield volcanoes on the Reykjanes Peninsula in southwest Iceland.

== Geography ==
The mountain range is located at about 20 to 25 km (12 to 16 mi) from Reykjavík as well as Hafnarfjörður and to the south of the cities on the Reykjanes peninsula of Southwest Iceland.

Brennisteinfjöll is not high. The highest mountain is Vífilsfell with 655 m.

== Geology ==
=== Position within Iceland’s volcano-tectonic environment ===
In Iceland there are about 32 volcanic systems. Volcanic system means a volcano-tectonic fissure system and – very often a bigger volcano, a so-called central volcano which in most cases is a stratovolcano and may contain a caldera. Brennisteinsfjöll does not include such a central volcano. The existence of the fissure systems in Iceland is explained by its situation, located on top of the Mid-Atlantic Ridge, a divergent plate boundary. There is most probably also a magmatic hot spot under the island which stands for increased magma production.

Brennisteinsfjöll is one of four (some scientists say five) volcanic systems on the big peninsula of Reykjanes in Southwest Iceland, as such the system forms part of the Reykjanes Volcanic Belt. These others are: Reykjanes volcanic system, around Gunnuhver at the tip of the peninsula, which mostly includes Svartsengi with the geothermal power station and the Blue Lagoon; to the east of the Reykjanes system is the Krýsuvík (volcanic system), including the geothermal areas around Seltún, Krýsuvík and Trölladyngja (Reykjanes) as well as lake Kleifarvatn; and to the northeast of the Brennisteinsfjöll lies the Hengill volcanic system which reaches out to the northeast over the lake Þingvallavatn to Þingvellir.

These volcanic systems are arranged en echelon and in a ca. 45° angle to the direction of rifting, scientists define this as an oblique arrangement. The volcanic systems of Reykjanes, Brennisteinsfjöll included, are stretched out in northeast-southwesterly direction over the rift on the peninsula.

=== General description of the Brennisteinsfjöll volcanic system ===
The volcanic system of Brennisteinsfjöll is 45 km (28 mi) long, has a width of about 10 km (6.2 mi) and covers about 280 km^{2} (110 sq mi). Most to the south are the Stóra Eldborg crater row and to the north Nyðri Eldborg. The volcanic system was the most productive of all the volcanic systems of the Reykjanes peninsula during the Holocene with 30-40 eruptions and around 10 since the settlement of Iceland in the 9th century.

=== Eruptions and current situation ===
One of the bigger lava flows of the system run south from Brennisteinsfjöll to the coast at Herdísarvík bay forming lava falls on their way. Previously it was thought that this lava flow had ceased before the settlement of Iceland (i.e. the end of the 8th century), but this is now thought that this was not the case as the coastal trail (now Route 42) was covered in lava at one stage.

The last eruption in the Brennisteinsfjöll volcanic system was a VEI-2 eruption in 1341.

It is a possible cause of St. Mary Magdalene’s flood 1342 in Central Europe und following bad years with Black Death to 1350. Brennisstein is the word for sulfur on Iceland, so great sulfur emissions with worldwide cooling for some years are possible and quite normal by this volcanic system.

Most of its rocks consist of basalt.

=== Brennisteinsfjöll geothermal areas ===
There is a high temperature geothermal area in Brennisteinsfjöll, but it is rather remote, about 20 km (12 mi) southeast of Reykjavík in the inner part of the Reykjavík peninsula. Fumaroles are to be found within an area of a few acres, and two more areas show signs of hydrothermal alteration. The surface conditions are complicated with a rough lava surface and the geothermal features which are located at a height of 450–500 m (1,480–1,640 ft) can only be reached on foot. The stratigraphy of the region includes hyaloclastite, older and younger lava flows.

In a fault, not far from Grindarskörð [ˈkrɪntarˌskœrθ], there are traces of a former geothermal area which is no more active.

=== Sulfur mining ===
As the name (Brennisteinsfjöll = Sulfur Mountains) suggests, sulfur is found here, though today in small amounts. But in the 19th century, a sulfur mine was run in the region by people from the United Kingdom. Mining was carried out just til the 1880s.

The mine was situated in a lava slope. The sulfur “was deposited into holes and fractures in the lava and between lava layers”. It was therefore difficult to reach and mine. The miners had first to break up the lava to get to the sulfur. The current geothermal activity is above this area.

The place of the former mine can be found by hiking the old trail Selvogsgata [ˈsɛlˌvɔksˌkaːta] and the following the so-called Draugahlíðar [ˈtrœyːɣaˌl̥iːðar̥] between the lava and the slope. There are still some ruins of the former mine and traces of transportation paths.

== Known mountains, craters and other volcanic landforms ==
Part of the Brennisteinsfjöll volcanic system are the Brennisteinsfjöll themselves (up on Hellisheiði), not really a mountain range, more some hills and crater rows, and the Bláfjöll mountain massif. The system includes two shield volcanoes, Heiðin há and Leitin. Among the many smaller subglacial mounds, tuyas, craters and eruptive vents are Stóra-Kóngsfell, Drottning, the Þríhnúkagígar crater trio – now famous because it is possible to see a magmatic feeder system from the inside -, and some craters named Eldborg (e.g. Eldborg í Bláfjöllum and Stóra-Eldborg undir Geitahlíð). The rootless cones of Rauðhólar near Reykjavík are also connected to a lava flow from this volcanic system.

== Nature protection in Brennisteinsfjöll ==
Some protected areas are to be found in the region of Brennisteinsfjöll. These are Herdísarvík Nature Reserve, Reykjanes Country Park, Bláfjöll Country Park and the two Natural Monuments Eldborgir undir Geitahlíð and Eldborg í Bláfjöllum.

== See also ==
- Geology of Reykjanes Peninsula
- Krýsuvík (volcanic system)
- Volcanism of Iceland
  - List of volcanic eruptions in Iceland
  - List of volcanoes in Iceland
