= Lava channel =

Type of volcanic landform

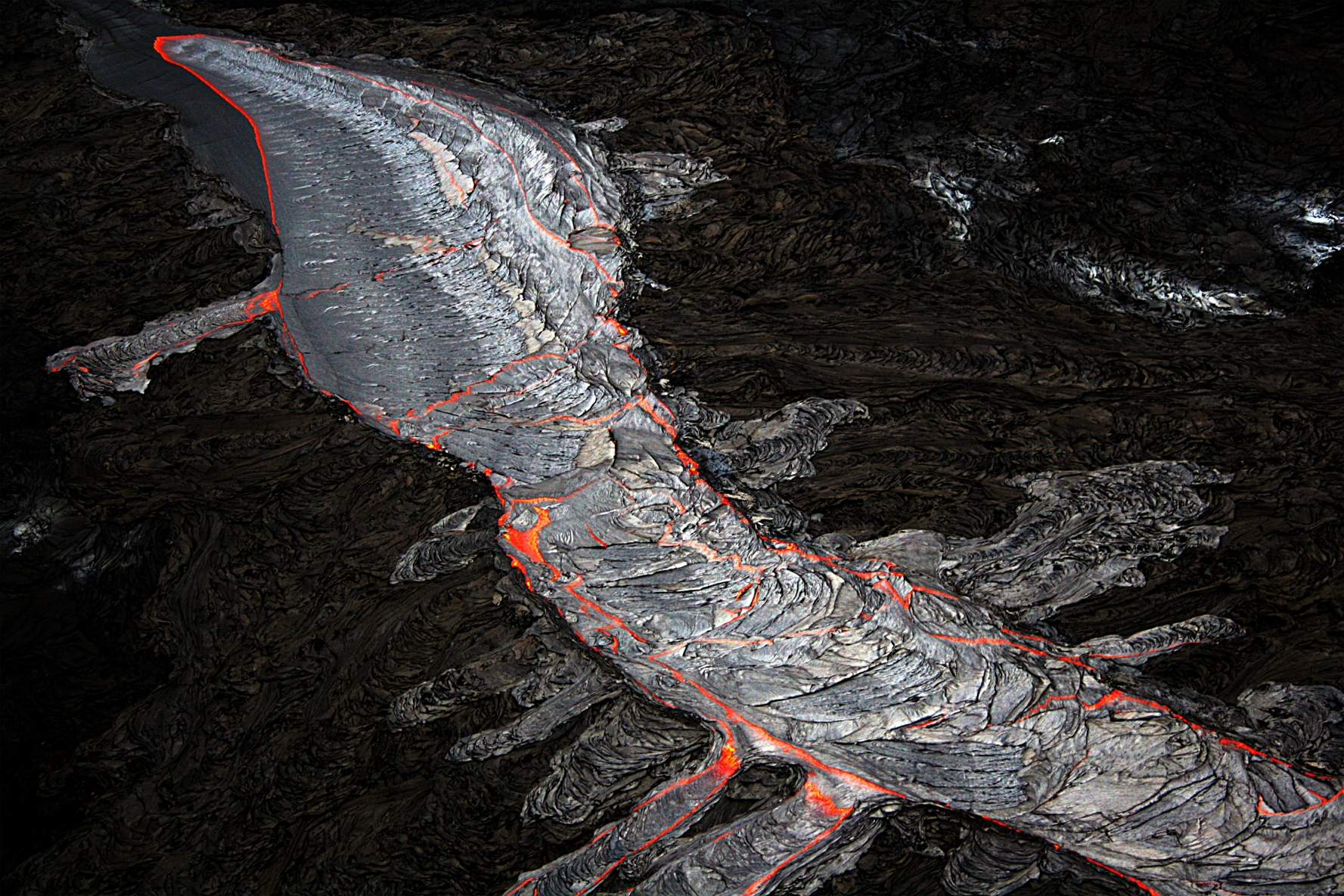
Pāhoehoe lava flow on the Big Island of Hawaii The picture shows overflows from a main lava channel. The channel is crusting over with a v-shaped opening pointing upstream (top left). The main channel and overflows show the perched nature of this kind of lava channel. Red liquid lava is breaking through ephemeral levees at the overflows.

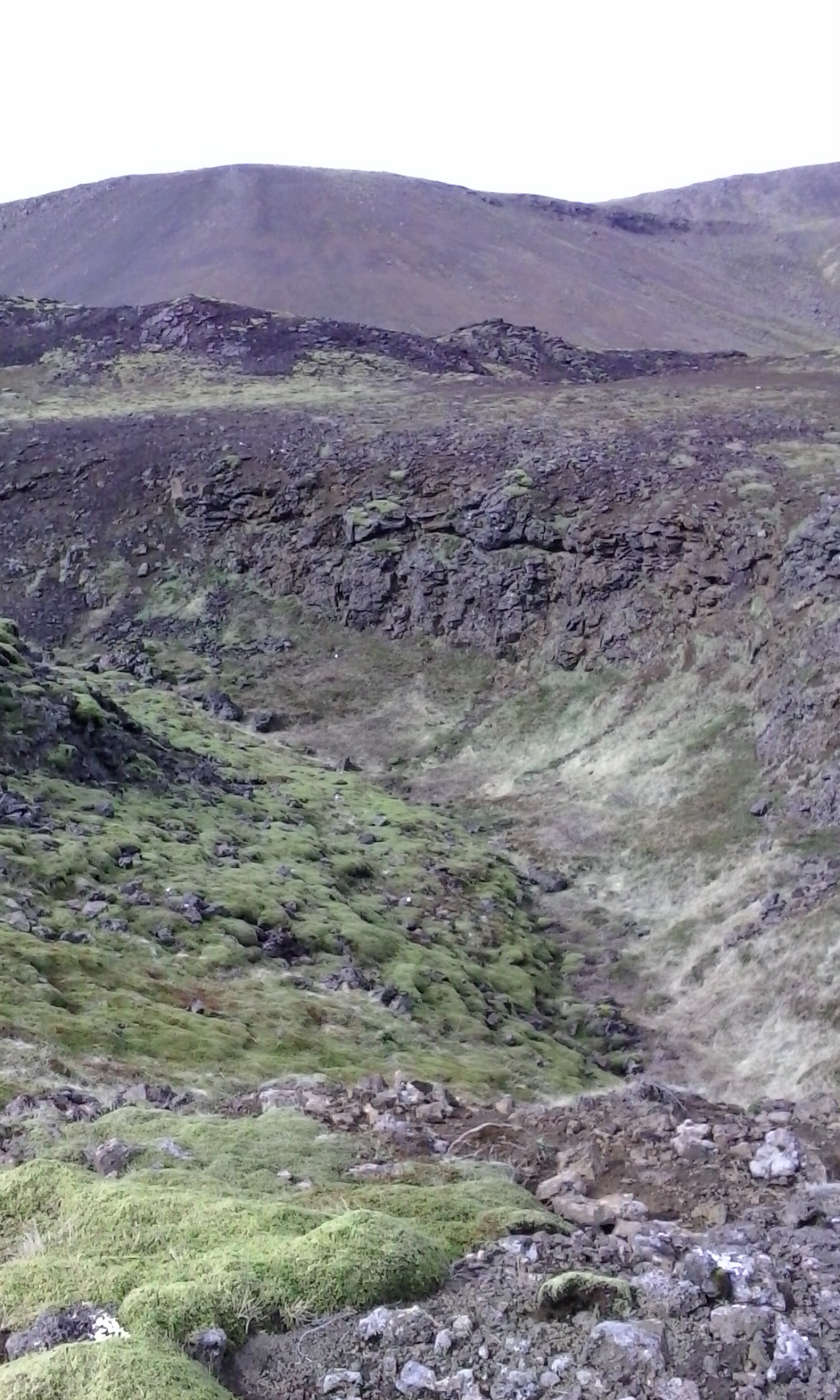
Slightly eroded lava channel at Stóra-Eldborg, Reykjanes, Iceland, left over from Holocene eruptions. In the background the respective eruption fissure with craters and behind, a tuya from the Pleistocene.

A lava channel is a stream of fluid lava contained within zones of static (i.e., solid and stationary) lava or lava levees. The initial channel may not contain levees per se, until the parental flow solidifies over what develops into the channel and creates natural levees. This initial levee allows for the building of a more complex levee and channel. As the lava flows through the channel, the elevation of the surface of the lava flow pulsates and lava can possibly flood the associated channel walls spilling out of the channel and over the existing levees, creating what is known as overflow levees. Overflow levees increase the height and width of the original levee. The lava that flows in lava channels is commonly basaltic in composition.

== In fiction ==
Lava channels are found throughout the 2002 video game The Elder Scrolls III: Morrowind under the Elvish name Foyadas, which features them as important routes on the volcanic island of Vvardenfell used by the native Ashlanders during the dry season, before they are filled with lava again during times of volcanic activity.

== See also ==
- Lava tube
