= Kaleo (band) =

Icelandic rock band

KALEO
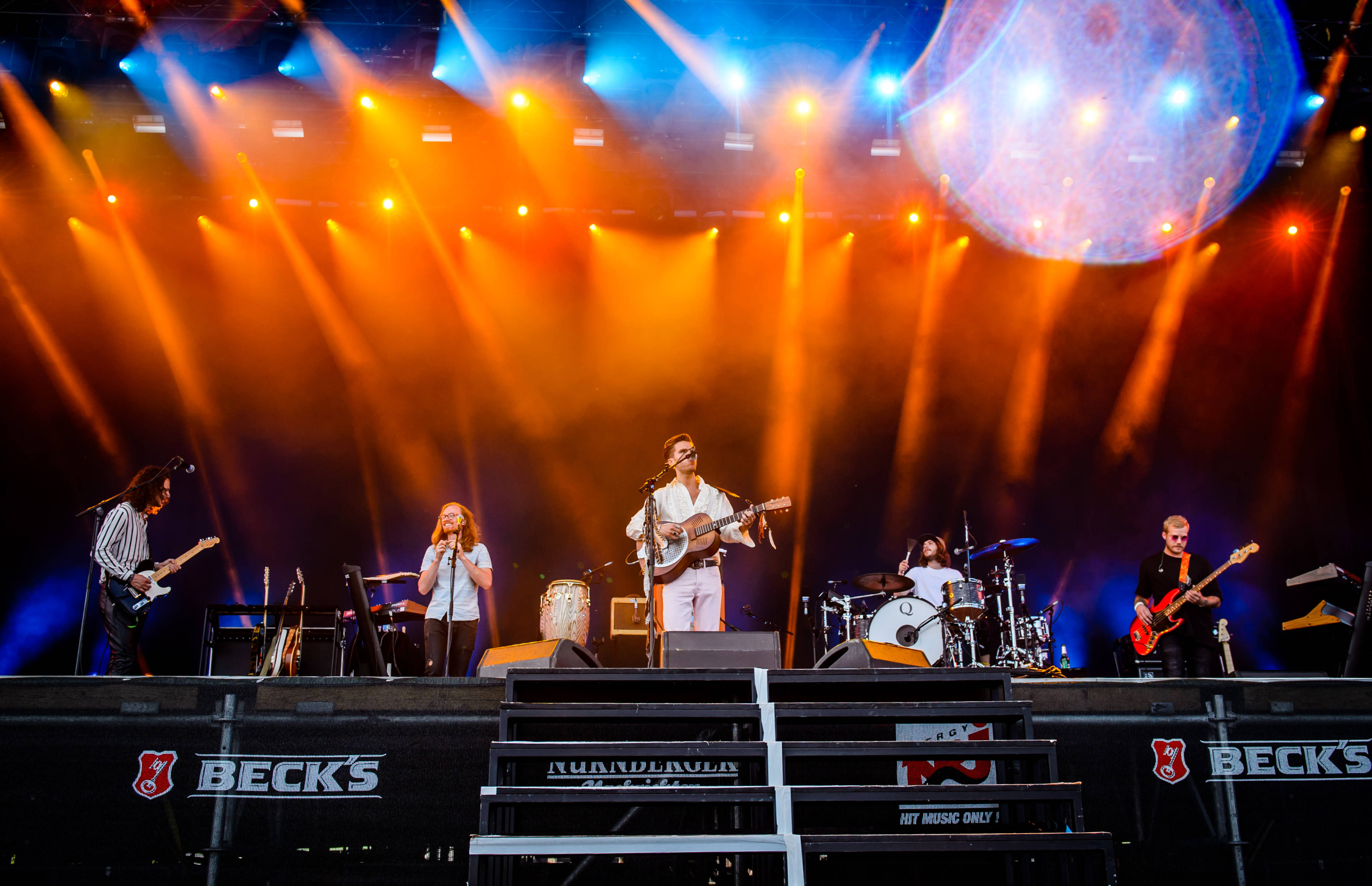
- In concert, 2018

Background information
- Origin: Mosfellsbær, Iceland
- Genres: Blues rock; indie folk; alternative rock
- Years active: 2012–present
- Label: Elektra
- Members: Jökull Júlíusson; Davíð Antonsson; Daníel Kristjánsson; Rubin Pollock; Þorleifur Gaukur Davíðsson
- Website: officialkaleo.com

KALEO (stylized in all caps) is an Icelandic blues rock band which formed in Mosfellsbær in 2012. It consists of lead vocalist and guitarist Jökull Júlíusson, drummer Davíð Antonsson, bassist Daniel Kristjánsson, lead guitarist Rubin Pollock and harmonicist Þorleifur Gaukur Davíðsson. They have released four studio albums, Kaleo (2013), A/B (2016), Surface Sounds (2021), and Mixed Emotions (2025), as well as the EP Glasshouse (2013).

A/B has sold over one million albums worldwide. Its second single, "Way Down We Go", was certified double platinum in the US and reached number one on the Billboard Alternative Songs chart on 20 August 2016. Kaleo received a Grammy Award nomination in 2017 for Best Rock Performance for the song "No Good".

== History ==
=== 2012–2013: Early years and self-titled album ===
Best friends since attending elementary school outside of Reykjavík, lead singer/rhythm guitarist Jökull Júlíusson (also known as JJ), drummer David Antonsson, and bassist Daniel Kristjansson began playing together at the age of 17 before adding lead guitarist Rubin Pollock to the mix in 2012. They named the band Kaleo, which means "the voice" in Hawaiian, and started their career with a handful of well-received shows at the 2012 Iceland Airwaves music festival, which was the band's first major public appearance. Kaleo gained fame after covering the song "Vor í Vaglaskógi" which received heavy rotation on Icelandic state broadcaster RÚV's radio station Rás 2 and was featured on the station's top 10 list. This song is also featured in the first episode of the TV series Trapped (2015). By year's end, Kaleo had signed with Sena, the country's main record label. Their self-titled debut went gold in their home country, spawning five number-one hits and inspiring their first European tour.

=== 2013–2019: major label record deal, departure to America, A/B and touring ===
In 2014, the band gained further attention with their single "All the Pretty Girls", which garnered over 87 million streams on Spotify. In early 2015, they signed with Atlantic Records and subsequently relocated to Austin, Texas. Throughout 2015, Kaleo received increasing attention in the United States. The band's South by Southwest (SXSW) debut in 2015 garnered press from Esquire's "40 Bands You Need to Hear" as well as NPR's "The Austin 100: SXSW 2015" feature and All Songs Considered's "SXSW 2015 Music Preview". "All the Pretty Girls" peaked at number 9 on Billboard's Adult Alternative Songs chart.

Another three singles were released to promote their upcoming major label debut album A/B: "Way Down We Go", "No Good", and "I Can't Go On Without You". The single "Way Down We Go", was released in August 2015 and gained critical acclaim. The single was certified gold in the United Kingdom, Belgium, Ireland, South Africa and Germany, Platinum in Russia, Australia and the United States, and triple platinum in Canada. The single "No Good" was released shortly after and was featured in the promo for HBO's Vinyl. The fourth single, "I Can't Go On Without You", was released on 18 February 2016. The album was released worldwide later that year on 10 June 2016.

The album peaked at number 16 on the Billboard 200, and the band embarked on a tour, the Handprint Tour, in order to promote it. The tour began on 11 September 2016 and concluded on 30 November 2016. The band embarked on a second tour, the fall Express Tour, which started on 25 August 2017 in Anaheim, California, and ended on 25 November in Moscow, Russia.

=== 2020–2024: Surface Sounds ===
On 15 January 2020, Kaleo released two singles, "I Want More" and "Break My Baby", the first music released since A/B. They followed this up with the announcement of the album's title and track list on 13 March, with the album scheduled for 5 June, along with dates for the Fight or Flight Tour, to take place July–September 2020. The third single "Alter Ego" was also released on 13 March, with JJ describing it as "the most classic rock and roll song". The fourth single "Backbone" was released on 17 April, although on 27 May, they delayed the album's release until further notice due to the COVID-19 pandemic. They were also forced to postpone their Fight or Flight tour twice, first to April–July 2021, and then to February–May 2022.

On 5 February 2021, they released a live version of "Break My Baby", recorded from Þrídrangar Lighthouse on 5 July 2020, the 78th anniversary of the lighthouse. The fifth single "Skinny" was released on 1 April 2021, with the announcement of the album's new release date of 23 April.

=== 2025–present: Mixed Emotions ===
On 21 February 2025, Kaleo announced their fourth studio album, Mixed Emotions, which was released on 9 May 2025.

== Musical style ==
Kaleo's music has been influenced by genres such as blues rock, indie folk and alternative rock. In an interview with Rolling Stone, frontman JJ explained, "Growing up I was listening to a lot of American music and blues artists and such and that was what kind of connected us." Their blues influences are mainly drawn from Delta blues which was the target for some of the heavier songs in their album A/B. Their music prominently features a distinctive resonator sound.

Lead singer JJ has given influences such as Jimi Hendrix, Carlos Santana and Jim Morrison, while critics liken their music to that of Hozier, Ray LaMontagne, Led Zeppelin, Cream and ZZ Top.

== Media appearances ==
The group has made multiple appearances on late night television shows including Conan, Jimmy Kimmel Live! Late Night with Seth Meyers and The Late Show With Stephen Colbert.

Their single "Way Down We Go" has been featured in many TV shows including Blindspot, The Blacklist, Lucifer, Supergirl, Grey's Anatomy, The Vampire Diaries, Riverdale, Training Day, Suits, Teen Wolf, The Night Shift, This Is Us and Underground, as well as trailers/promos for The Good Fight, Quantico, Orange Is the New Black, Empire, The Leftovers and Logan, among others. Kaleo's 'I can't go on without you' was used on the Sky Italy produced Petra TV detective series (Series 1, Episode 4 - 2020).

Several Kaleo songs including "Way Down We Go", "Hot Blood", "No Good", "All the Pretty Girls" and "Glass House" have been featured in FIFA 16, Madden NFL 17, NHL 18, Far Cry 5, The Crew 2, Rocksmith 2014 and Asphalt 9: Legends. Their song "Automobile" was used in Collateral Beauty and "Break my Baby" features in the video game MLB The Show 20.

== Members ==
The band is made up of:

- Jökull Júlíusson (short: JJ) – lead vocals, rhythm guitar, piano
- Rubin Pollock – lead guitar
- Daníel Ægir Kristjánsson – bass, keyboard
- Davíð Antonsson – drums, percussion, backing vocals
- Þorleifur Gaukur Davíðsson – harmonica, bongos, keyboard

== Discography ==
=== Albums ===
List of studio albums, with selected chart positions and certifications shown
Title	Details	Peak chart positions										Certifications
Title	Details	ICE	AUS	BEL (FL)	BEL (WA)	CAN	FRA	GER	SWI	UK	US	Certifications
Kaleo	Released: 15 November 2013; Label: Sena; Formats: Digital download	1	—	—	—	—	—	—	—	—	—	FHF: Platinum
A/B	Released: 10 June 2016; Label: Elektra; Formats: Digital download, streaming, CD, vinyl	4	29	21	31	2	28	9	6	27	16	FHF: Platinum; BPI: Gold; BVMI: Gold; MC: 2× Platinum; RIAA: Platinum; SNEP: Platinum
Surface Sounds	Released: 23 April 2021; Label: Elektra; Formats: Digital download, streaming, CD, vinyl	1	56	7	20	18	60	16	4	34	102	
Mixed Emotions	Released: 9 May 2025; Label: Elektra; Formats: Digital download, streaming, CD, vinyl	2	—	—	91	—	179	—	39	— (Note: Mixed Emotions did not enter the UK Albums Chart, but peaked at number 70 on the UK Albums Sales Chart.)	—	
"—" denotes a recording that did not chart or was not released in that territory.

=== Singles ===
Title	Year	Peak chart positions										Certifications	Album
Title	Year	ICE	AUS	BEL (FL)	BEL (WA)	CAN	FRA	GER	SWI	UK	US	Certifications	Album
"Vor í Vaglaskógi"	2013	4	—	—	—	—	—	—	—	—	—		Kaleo
"Rock n' Roller"	2013	—	—	—	—	—	—	—	—	—	—		Kaleo
"Glass House"	2013	—	—	—	—	—	—	—	—	—	—		Kaleo
"Automobile"	2013	—	—	—	—	—	—	—	—	—	—		Kaleo
"Broken Bones"	2013	—	—	—	—	—	—	—	—	—	—		Kaleo
"I Walk On Water"	2014	—	—	—	—	—	—	—	—	—	—		Kaleo
"All the Pretty Girls"	2014	—	—	— (Note: "All the Pretty Girls" did not enter the Ultratop 50, but peaked at number 30 on the Flemish Ultratip chart.)	—	—	—	—	—	—	—	ARIA: Platinum; BPI: Silver; MC: 2× Platinum; RIAA: Gold	A/B
"Way Down We Go"	2015	2	30	8	44	60	4	6	10	96	54	ARIA: 5× Platinum; BEA: Gold; BPI: 2× Platinum; BVMI: Platinum; MC: 8× Platinum; RIAA: 2× Platinum; SNEP: Diamond	A/B
"No Good"	2015	—	—	—	— (Note: "No Good" did not enter the Ultratop 50, but charted as an "extra tip" on the Wallonie Ultratip chart.)	—	—	—	—	—	—	ARIA: Gold; BPI: Silver; MC: Platinum	A/B
"I Can't Go On Without You"	2016	7	—	—	—	—	—	—	—	—	—	MC: Gold	A/B
"I Want More"	2020	4	—	— (Note: "I Want More" did not enter the Ultratop 50, but charted as an "extra tip" on the Flemish Ultratip chart.)	— (Note: "I Want More" did not enter the Ultratop 50, but peaked at number 14 on the Wallonie Ultratip chart.)	—	—	—	—	—	—		Surface Sounds
"Break My Baby"	2020	32	—	—	— (Note: "Break My Baby" did not enter the Ultratop 50, but charted as an "extra tip" on the Wallonie Ultratip chart.)	—	—	—	—	—	—		Surface Sounds
"Alter Ego"	2020	—	—	—	—	—	—	—	—	—	—		Surface Sounds
"Backbone"	2020	—	—	—	—	—	—	—	—	—	—		Surface Sounds
"Skinny"	2021	4	—	—	—	—	—	—	—	—	—		Surface Sounds
"Lonely Cowboy"	2024	29	—	—	—	—	—	—	—	—	—		Non-album single
"Back Door"	2025	—	—	—	—	—	—	—	—	—	—		Mixed Emotions
"—" denotes a recording that did not chart or was not released in that territory.

=== Other charted and certified songs ===
Title	Year	Peak chart positions							Certifications	Album
Title	Year	ICE	CIS	CZR	LTU	LVA	RUS	UKR	Certifications	Album
"Save Yourself"	2016	7	—	—	—	—	—	—	MC: Gold	A/B
"Way Down We Go" (Menko remix radio edit)	2017	—	54	—	—	—	45	6		Non-album songs
"Way Down We Go" (Pilarinos & Karypidis remix)	2017	—	157	—	154	196	154	152		Non-album songs
"Hey Gringo"	2021	3	—	—	—	—	—	—		Surface Sounds
"Bloodline"	2025	—	—	8	—	—	—	—		Mixed Emotions
"—" denotes a recording that did not chart or was not released in that territory.

=== Music videos ===
Title	Year	Director
"Vor í Vaglaskógi"	2013	Baldvin Vernharðsson, Hörður Freyr Brynjarsson
"Rock n' Roller""	2013	Hörður Freyr Brynjarsson
"All The Pretty Girls"	2014	Baldvin Vernharðson, Davíð Antonsson Crivello, Pétur Már Pétursson
"Way Down We Go"	2016	Shaun Silva
"No Good"	2016	Hörður Freyr Brynjarsson
"Still No Good"	2026	Justin Pagano

=== Awards ===
"No Good" received a Grammy nomination for Best Rock Performance.

== Tours ==
- Opened for Vance Joy in late 2015.
- SXSW 2015 – Debut included performances at Pandora's Discovery Den, KGSR, Neiman Marcus Make Some Noise, and more.
- 2016 – Byron Bay Bluesfest
- 2016 -- Newburyport Riverfront Music Festival
- 2016 – "Way Down We Go" Tour ft. "Dizzy" Daniel Moorehead
- 2016–2017 – Kaleo Handprint Tour
- 2017 – Opened for The Lumineers Cleopatra Tour
- 2017.09.09 – Opened for The Rolling Stones (in Hamburg)
- 2017 – Kaleo Express Tour
- 2022 – Fight or Flight Tour
- 2024.06.11 - Opened for The Rolling Stones in Philadelphia
