= Stóra-Eldborg undir Geitahlíð =

Volcano in Iceland

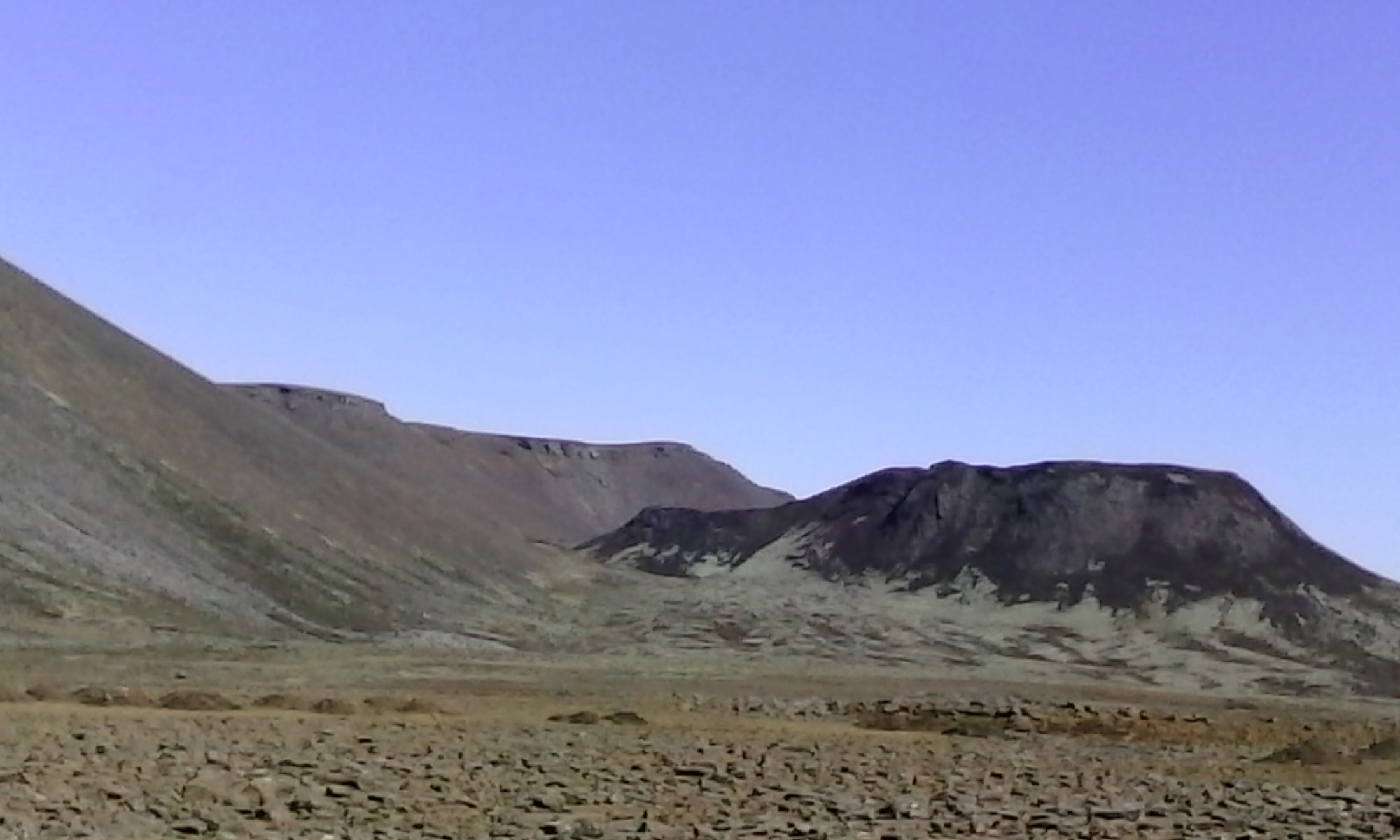
- Stóra-Eldborg

Highest point
- Elevation: 50 m (160 ft)(Íslandshandbókin. Náttúra, saga og sérkenni. Reykjavík 1989, p. 45)
- Coordinates: 63°51′21″N 21°59′54″W

Naming
- English translation: Big rock of fire under the goat slope
- Language of name: Icelandic

Geography
- Location within Iceland
- Location: Iceland

Geology
- Rock age: Holocene
- Mountain type: Pyroclastic cone
- Last eruption: Holocene

Climbing
- Easiest route: marked hiking trail

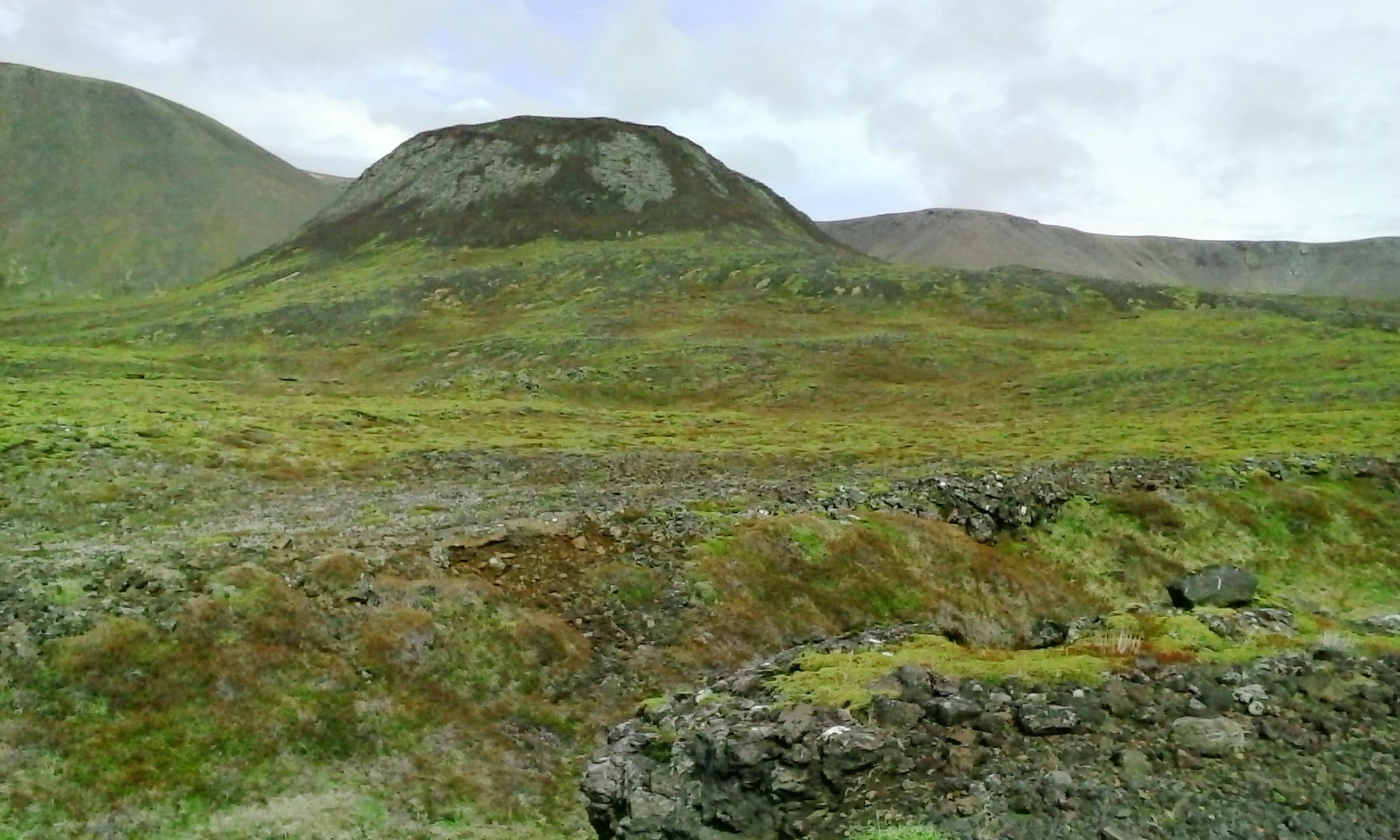
Stóra-Eldborg with lava channel in the foreground

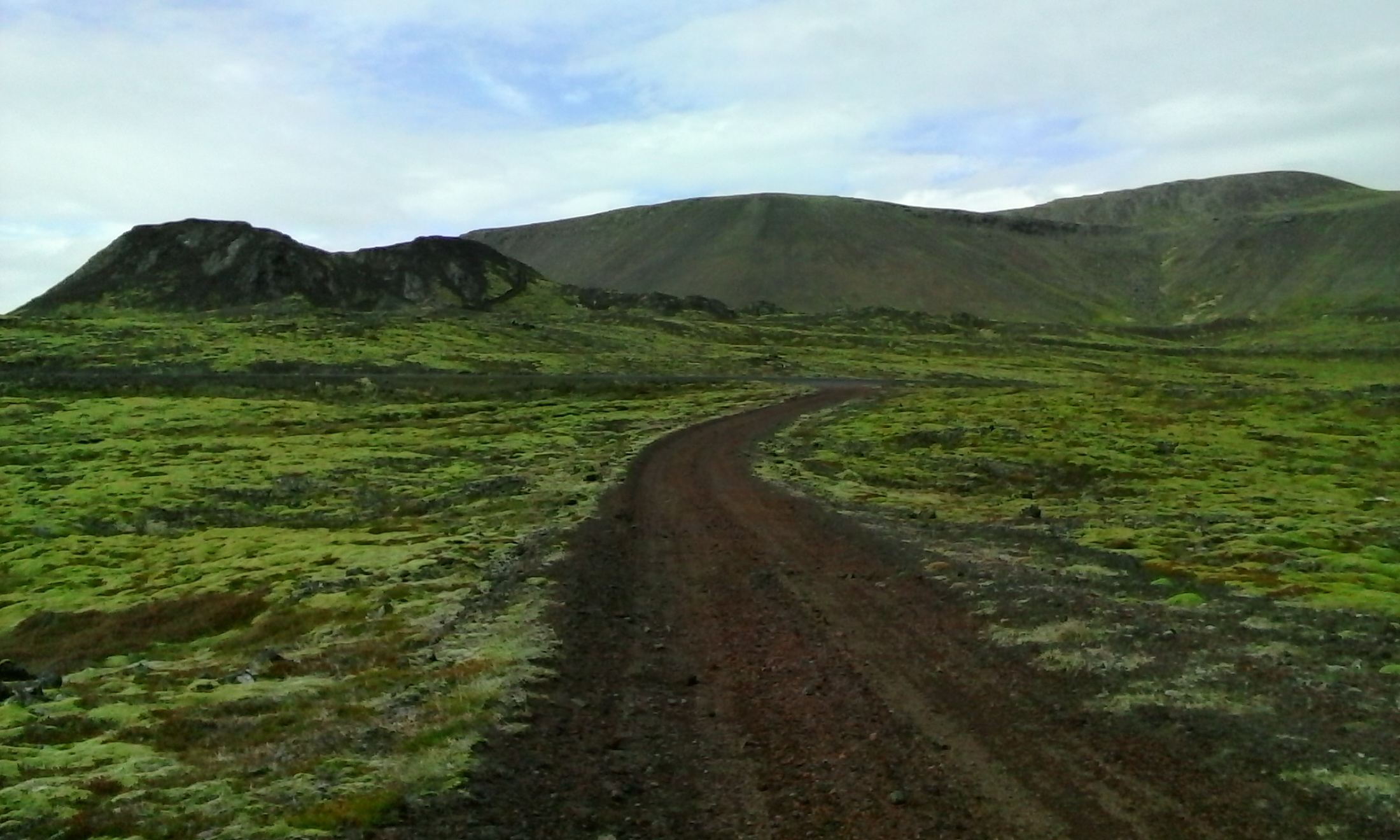
Stóra-Eldborg with its eruption fissure, tuya Geitahlíð behind

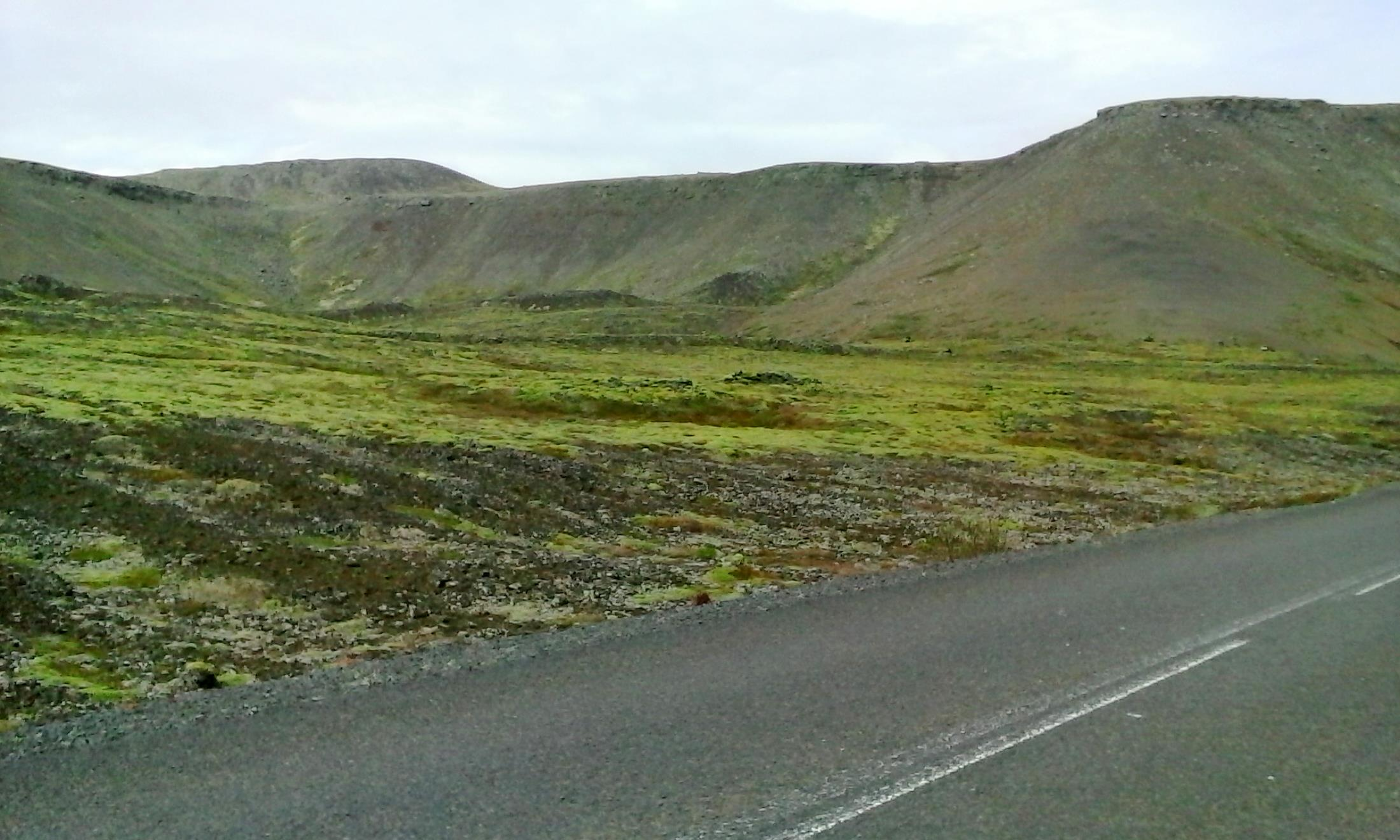
Eldborgir eruption fissure dissecting the tuya

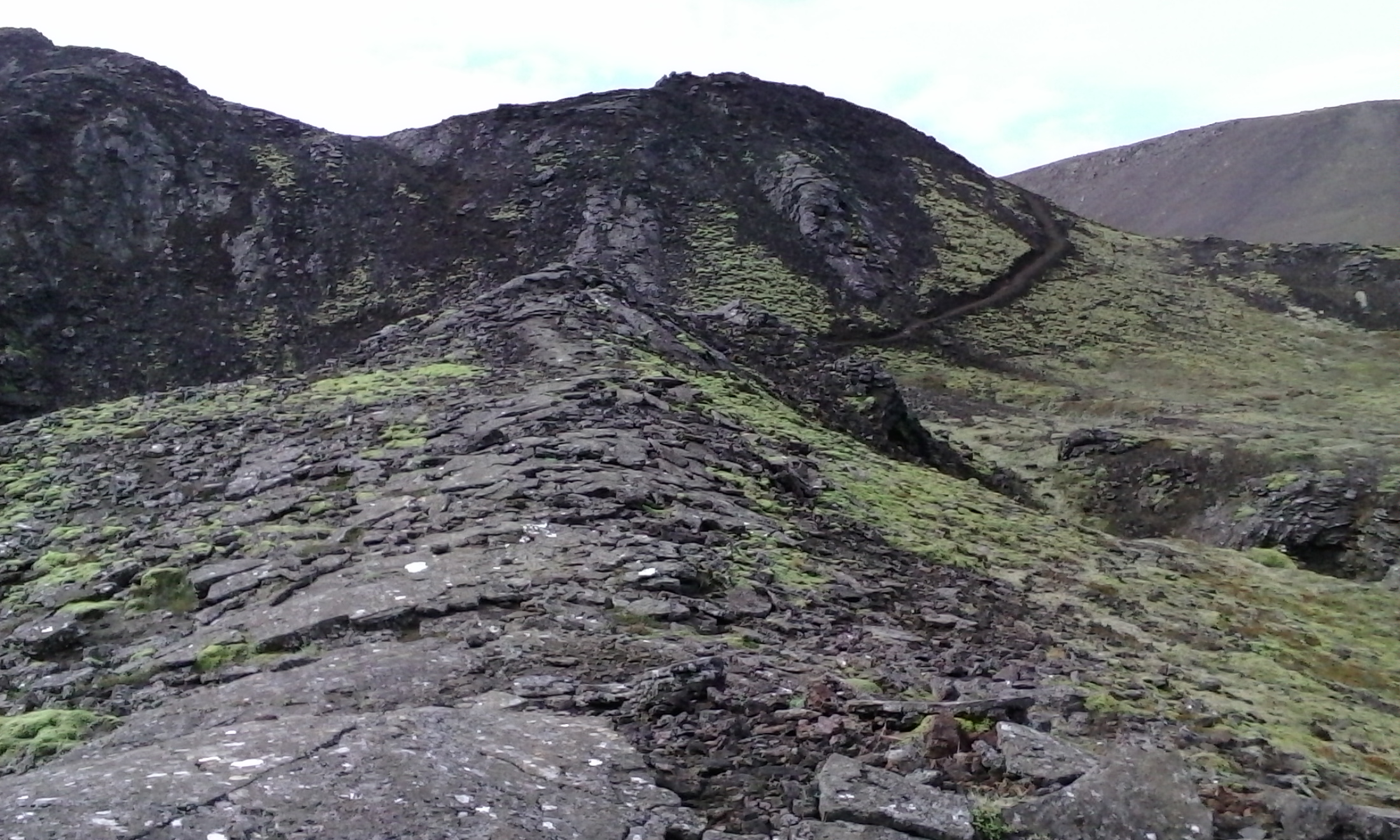
Stóra-Eldborg from the roof of one of its lava tubes

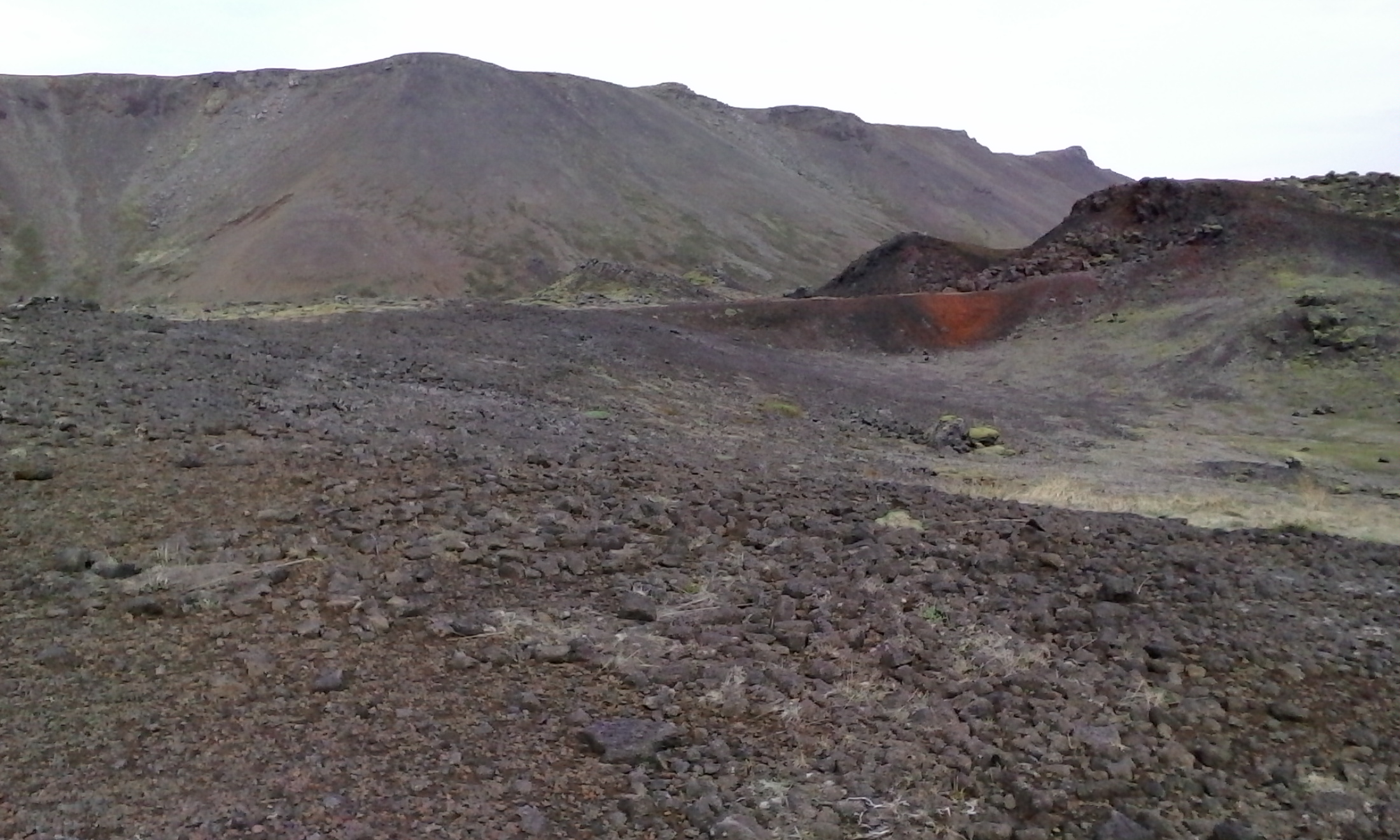
Quarry and outcrops at Litla-Eldborg, Geitahlíð behind

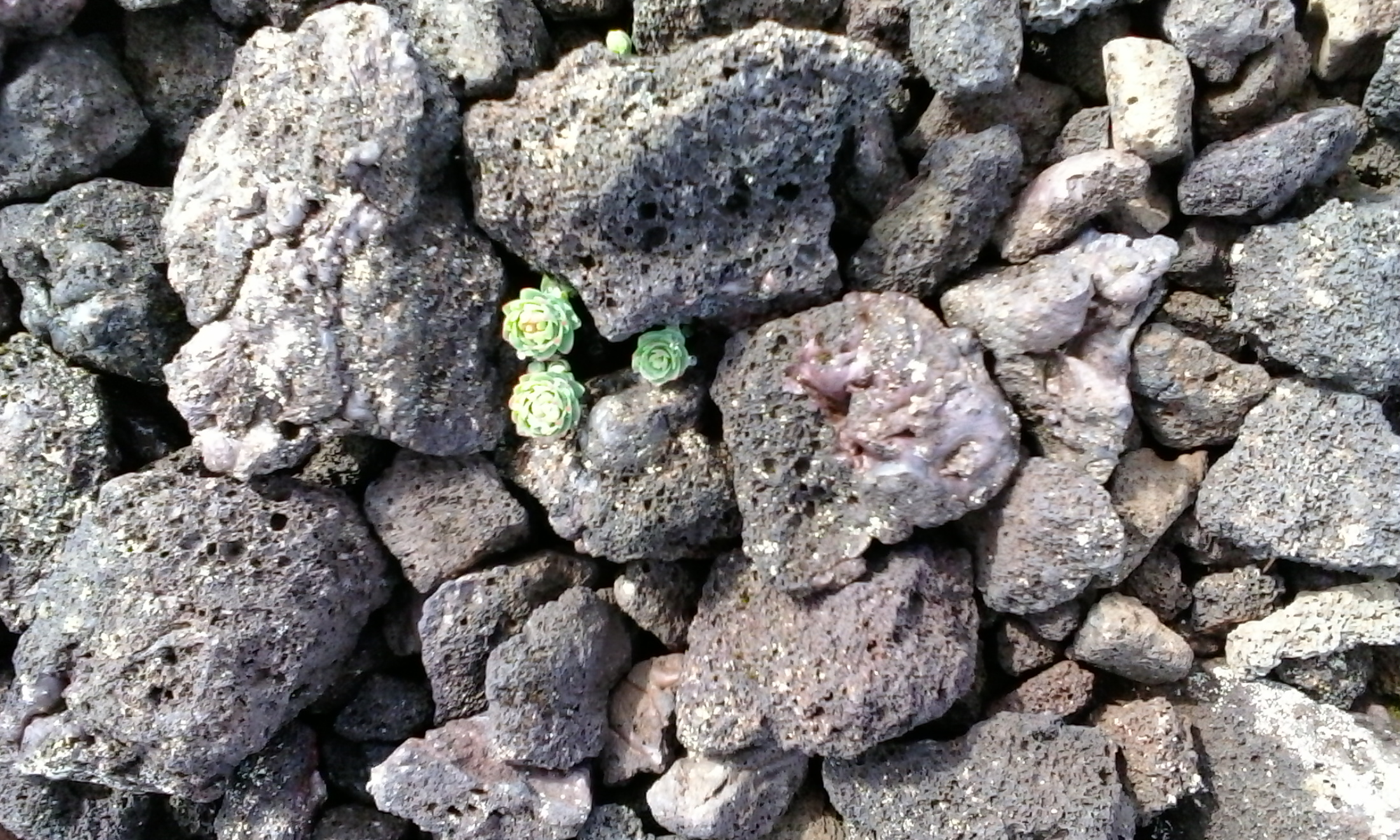
Scoria from the Eldborgir

Stóra-Eldborg undir Geitahlíð (Icelandic pronunciation: [ˈstouːra-ˌɛltˌpɔrk ˈʏntɪr ˈceiːtaˌl̥iːθ]; also Stóra-Eldborg við Geitahlíð [...vɪð...]) is a small Holocene volcano in Iceland, on Reykjanes peninsula, 50 m high, with a 30 m deep crater. It is located at about 5 km from Krýsuvík and as the name says at the foot of a bigger mountain, the tuya of Geitahlíð.

== Volcanism ==
=== Eruption fissures of the Brennisteinsfjöll volcanic system ===
Despite its location, just some 5 km from the high temperature area of Seltún, the volcano and its counterparts, the crater rows, fissures, as well as the tuya Geitahlíð (385 m) with the crater Æsubúðir [ˈaiːsʏˌpuːðɪr̥] on its top, are not part of the Krýsuvík volcanic system, but of the volcanic system of Brennisteinsfjöll as its southernmost outpost.

Eldborgir erupted about 2400 BP. The crater row also includes some lava channels. The lava extruded during the eruption ran 2.5 kilometres (1.6 mi) to the sea.

=== The pyroclastic cones ===
Stóra-Eldborg undir Geitahlíð is a pyroclastic cone, built up mostly from spatter and scoria it forms part of a crater row.

Another such eruption fissure is to be found nearby, therefore Icelanders prefer the plural Eldborgir undir Geitahlíð. One of the eruption fissures dissects the older tuya Geitahlíð.

The Litla-Eldborg crater is part of the parallel crater row and eruption fissure. The eruption products of both fissures are petrologically different when compared. For this reason, it has been thought, that the fissures are not from the same eruption series.

Litla-Eldborg regrettably is rather damaged by quarrying.

=== Tuya Geitahlíð ===
The pyroclastic cones bear their name, because they are located very near to the tuya Geitahlíð (386 m), and one of the fissures even can be seen dissecting the side of the older volcano. The tuya has its origin in subglacial eruptions under a Pleistocene glacier during a cold spell of the Ice Age. A Holocene crater is located up on summit plateau of the tuya which produced the lava field Krýsuvíkurhraun. It entered the sea to the south and formed the upper layers at Krýsuvíkurbjarg.

== Folktales ==
The location is connected to the folktale about the cousins Krýsa and Herdís. The old women, who could use witchcraft, had a hefty discussion about the borders of their respective lands. One wanted to cast a spell so that all the fish in a nearby lake would be hairy, and the other intended to bring up a storm and let all fishermen die, however, this did not happen. Instead, the dispute ended with the death of both cousins. The folktale maintains that they were buried side by side, and that the location of their graves is still known to locals.

== Nature protection ==
The crater and its surroundings were placed under nature protection in 1987 as a natural monument inside of Reykjanesfólkvangur.

== Hiking ==
There are some – partially marked - hiking trails on the eruption fissure, up to the rim of the Stóra-Eldborg-Crater and in the vicinity. Reynir Ingibjartsson also proposes a tour up on the tuya through a small valley behind Stóra-Eldborg to visit the crater up on the tuya and because of the view over all of the south coast of Reykjanes as well as over other parts of Iceland's south coast up to Eyjafjallajökull.
