= Athletics at the 2025 Summer World University Games – Women's 800 metres =

Women's 800 metres at the 2025 Summer World University Games
- Venue: Lohrheidestadion
- Location: Bochum, Germany
- Dates: 22 July (heats); 23 July (semi-finals); 24 July (final)
- Competitors: 40 from 29 nations
- Winning time: 1:59.84

Medalists
gold medal	Eloisa Coiro	Italy
silver medal	Veronica Vancardo	Switzerland
bronze medal	Daniela García	Spain

The women's 800 metres event at the 2025 Summer World University Games was held in Bochum, Germany, at Lohrheidestadion on 22, 23 and 24 July.

== Records ==
Prior to the competition, the records were as follows:

Record	Athlete (nation)	Time (s)	Location	Date
Games record	Slobodanka Čolović (YUG)	49.88	Zagreb, Yugoslavia	19 July 1987

== Results ==
=== Heats ===
First 4 in each heat (Q) and the next 4 fastest (q) qualified for the semi-finals.

==== Heat 1 ====
Place	Athlete	Nation	Time	Notes
1	Gladys Chepngetich	Kenya	2:02.63	Q
2	Laura Pellicoro	Italy	2:02.70	Q
3	Charne Swart	South Africa	2:02.73	Q
4	Hayley Kitching	Australia	2:03.35	Q
5	Petja Klojčnik	Slovenia	2:03.96	q
6	Sophie Coutts	Canada	2:05.04	q, PB
7	Emma Douglass	New Zealand	2:07.28	
8	Stina Pettersson	Sweden	2:09.67	

==== Heat 2 ====
Place	Athlete	Nation	Time	Notes
1	Veronica Vancardo	Switzerland	2:02.76	Q
2	Chloe Foerster	United States	2:02.84	Q
3	Lucy Armitage	Great Britain	2:03.79	Q
4	Amandeep Kaur	India	2:03.89	Q
5	Tugba Toptas	Turkey	2:04.27	q
6	Alina Korsunska	Ukraine	2:06.13	q
7	Priscilla Akello	Uganda	2:12.33	
8	Hizillawanty Jamain	Malaysia	2:18.45	SB

==== Heat 3 ====
Place	Athlete	Nation	Time	Notes
1	Daniela García	Spain	2:06.52	Q
2	Pavla Štoudková	Czech Republic	2:06.55	Q
3	Veera Mattila	Finland	2:06.58	Q
4	Tessa Buswell	United States	2:06.73	Q
5	Charlotte Buckley	Great Britain	2:07.28	
6	Pamela Nicol Barreto	Ecuador	2:10.74	SB
7	Marvorous Orishaba	Uganda	2:11.57	
8	Liis Grete Atonen	Estonia	2:19.00	

==== Heat 4 ====
Place	Athlete	Nation	Time	Notes
1	Eloisa Coiro	Italy	2:04.12	Q
2	Fanny Arendt	Luxembourg	2:04.63	Q
3	Julia Jaguścik	Poland	2:05.71	Q
4	Veera Perälä	Finland	2:06.50	Q
5	Klara Andrijašević	Croatia	2:06.76	PB
6	Yuri Nishida	Japan	2:07.02	
7	Switlana Schulschyk	Ukraine	2:09.03	
8	Awa Koné	Mali	2:20.38	PB

==== Heat 5 ====
Place	Athlete	Nation	Time	Notes
1	Smilla Kolbe	Germany	2:05.66	Q
2	K. M. Chanda	India	2:05.95	Q
3	Lucia Juan	Spain	2:06.48	Q
4	Veronika Sadek	Slovenia	2:06.89	Q
5	Michelle Gröbli	Switzerland	2:07.62	
6	Julia Agostinelli	Canada	2:09.00	
7	Hédi Heffner	Hungary	2:09.67	
8	Aishat Nna Mohammed	Nigeria	2:57.65	

=== Semi-finals ===
First 2 in each heat (Q) and the next 2 fastest (q) qualified for the final.

==== Heat 1 ====
Place	Athlete	Nation	Time	Notes
1	Eloisa Coiro	Italy	2:02.28	Q
2	Daniela García	Spain	2:02.49	Q
3	Pavla Štoudková	Czech Republic	2:03.16	
4	Julia Jaguścik	Poland	2:03.83	
5	Tugba Toptas	Turkey	2:04.35	
6	Hayley Kitching	Australia	2:04.47	
7	Veera Perälä	Finland	2:05.74	PB
8	Petja Klojčnik	Slovenia	2:08.47	

==== Heat 2 ====
Place	Athlete	Nation	Time	Notes
1	Veronica Vancardo	Switzerland	2:01.40	Q
2	Charne Swart	South Africa	2:01.68	Q
3	Fanny Arendt	Luxembourg	2:02.10	q
4	Chloe Foerster	United States	2:02.13	q
5	Lucy Armitage	Great Britain	2:03.02	PB
6	Veronika Sadek	Slovenia	2:04.60	
7	Amandeep Kaur	India	2:04.84	
8	Alina Korsunska	Ukraine	2:06.34	

==== Heat 3 ====
Place	Athlete	Nation	Time	Notes
1	Smilla Kolbe	Germany	2:01.89	Q
2	K. M. Chanda	India	2:02.05	Q
3	Gladys Chepngetich	Kenya	2:02.57	SB
4	Laura Pellicoro	Italy	2:02.88	
5	Lucia Juan	Spain	2:05.26	
6	Sophie Coutts	Canada	2:06.13	
7	Tessa Buswell	United States	2:08.70	
—	Veera Mattila	Finland	DNF	

=== Final ===
Place	Athlete	Nation	Time	Notes
1st place, gold medalist(s)	Eloisa Coiro	Italy	1:59.84	
2nd place, silver medalist(s)	Veronica Vancardo	Switzerland	2:00.08	
3rd place, bronze medalist(s)	Daniela García	Spain	2:00.12	
4	Fanny Arendt	Luxembourg	2:01.04	
5	Smilla Kolbe	Germany	2:01.42	
6	Charne Swart	South Africa	2:01.45	
7	Chloe Foerster	United States	2:01.58	
8	K. M. Chanda	India	2:02.00	
