= Wheelchair 3x3 basketball at the 2025 Summer World University Games – Women's tournament =

Women's wheelchair 3x3 tournament at the 2025 Summer World University Games
- Venue: Jahrhunderthalle
- Location: Bochum
- Dates: 17—20 July 2025
- Nations: 4

Medalists
gold medal	Germany
silver medal	Spain
bronze medal	United States

The women's wheelchair 3x3 tournament in basketball at the 2025 Summer Universiade in Rhine-Ruhr, Germany was held from 17 to 20 July 2025. This was the first edition of wheelchair 3x3 basketball at the Summer World University Games.

== Rosters ==
Team	Players			
Brazil	Paula Silva	Rebeca Freires	Laura Nauderer	Maria Oliveira
Germany	Lilly Sellak	Svenja Erni	Catharina Weiss	Lisa Bergenthal
Spain	Beatriz Zudaire	Sara Revuelta	Sindy Ramos	Naiara Rodríguez
United States	Anesia Glascoe	Hannah Exline	Marlee Wagstaff	Elizabeth Becker

== Preliminary round ==
=== Group phase ===
Pos	Team	Pld	W	L	PF	PA	PD	Qualification
1	Spain	3	3	0	42	17	+25	Qualification for quarterfinals
2	Germany	3	2	1	39	16	+23	Qualification for quarterfinals
3	United States	3	1	2	31	21	+10	Qualification for quarterfinals
4	Brazil	3	0	3	3	61	−58	Qualification for quarterfinals

Source: rhineruhr2025

17 July 2025
13:10

Boxscore

United States	19–1	Brazil
Pts: Glascoe 10		Pts: Silva 1

Jahrhunderthalle, Bochum
Referees: Pierre Charrier (FRA), Veronica Restuccia (UAE)

17 July 2025
13:35

Boxscore

Spain	10–9	Germany
Pts: Zudaire 7		Pts: Weiss 5

Jahrhunderthalle, Bochum
Referees: Susan Nyambura Ndichu (KEN), Pedro Vásquez (CHI)

17 July 2025
16:50

Boxscore

United States	6–9	Germany
Pts: Glascoe 3		Pts: Weiss 4

Jahrhunderthalle, Bochum
Referees: Pierre Charrier (FRA), Patricia Díez (ESP)

18 July 2025
12:45

Boxscore

Spain	21–2	Brazil
Pts: Rodríguez 8		Pts: Silva 2

Jahrhunderthalle, Bochum
Referees: Pierre Charrier (FRA), Veronica Restuccia (UAE)

18 July 2025
17:45

Boxscore

United States	6–11	Spain
Pts: Glascoe 3		Pts: Zudaire 6

Jahrhunderthalle, Bochum
Referees: Doris Korsman-Kaschmieder (NED), Pedro Vásquez (CHI)

18 July 2025
18:10

Boxscore

Germany	21–0	Brazil
Pts: Bergenthal 9

Jahrhunderthalle, Bochum
Referees: Patricia Díez (ESP), Veronica Restuccia (UAE)

== Knockout stage ==
=== Bracket ===
Semifinals
20 July
A1 Spain	20
A4 Brazil	0
20 July
A2 Germany	12
A3 United States	4

Final
20 July
A1 Spain	11
A2 Germany	12
3rd place
20 July
A4 Brazil	3
A3 United States	11

=== Semifinals ===
20 July 2025
10:00

Boxscore

Spain	20–0	Brazil
Pts: Rodríguez 6

Jahrhunderthalle, Bochum
Referees: Susan Nyambura Ndichu (KEN), Veronica Restuccia (UAE)

20 July 2025
10:25

Boxscore

Germany	12–4	United States
Pts: Weiss, Bergenthal 4		Pts: Glascoe 3

Jahrhunderthalle, Bochum
Referees: Pierre Charrier (FRA), Patricia Díez (ESP)

=== Bronze medal game ===
20 July 2025
14:15

Boxscore

Brazil	3–11	United States
Pts: Silva 2		Pts: Glascoe 5

Jahrhunderthalle, Bochum
Referees: Doris Korsman-Kaschmieder (NED), Susan Nyambura Ndichu (KEN)

=== Gold medal game ===
20 July 2025
16:15

Boxscore

Spain	11–12 (OT)	Germany
Pts: Rodríguez 4		Pts: Weiss 5

Jahrhunderthalle, Bochum
Referees: Pierre Charrier (FRA), Veronica Restuccia (UAE)

== Final standings ==
Place	Team	Record
1st place, gold medalist(s)	Germany	4–1
2nd place, silver medalist(s)	Spain	4–1
3rd place, bronze medalist(s)	United States	2–3
4	Brazil	0–3
