= Swimming at the 2025 Summer World University Games – Men's 50 metre breaststroke =

Men's 50 metre breaststroke at the 2025 Summer World University Games
- Venue: Schwimm- und Sprunghalle im Europasportpark
- Location: Berlin
- Dates: 21 July (heats and semifinals); 22 July (final)
- Competitors: 54 from 36 nations

Medalists
gold medal	Federico Rizzardi	Italy
silver medal	Reo Okura	Japan
bronze medal	Dawid Wiekiera	Poland

The men's 50 metre breaststroke at the 2025 Summer World University Games in Rhine-Ruhr, Germany was held from 21 to 22 July 2025. Federico Rizzardi from Italy won the gold medal, Reo Okura from Japan took the silver medal and Dawid Wiekiera from Poland earned the bronze medal.

== Schedule ==
All times are Central European Time (UTC+1)

Date	Time	Round
21 July	09:49	Heats
21 July	19:36	Semifinals
22 July	20:33	Final

== Records ==
Prior to the competition, the world and Universiade records were as follows.

Category	Swimmer	Record	Date	Place	Event
World record	(United States) Adam Peaty	25.95	25 July 2017	Budapest, Hungary	2017 World Championships
Universiade record	(China) Qin Haiyang	26.38	5 August 2023	Chengdu, China	2021 Summer World University Games

== Results ==
=== Heats ===
All entered athletes competed across multiple seeded heats in the morning session. Swimmers with the top 16 fastest times advanced, regardless of which individual heat they swam.

Rank	Heat	Lane	Swimmer	Nation	Time	Notes
1	6	5	Federico Rizzardi	Italy	27.13	Q
2	6	6	Archie Goodburn	Great Britain	27.41	Q
3	5	5	Nathaniel Germonprez	United States	27.51	Q
3	6	4	Reo Okura	Japan	27.51	Q
5	7	3	Flavio Mangiameli	Italy	27.54	Q
6	6	2	Dawid Wiekiera	Poland	27.61	Q
7	7	7	Maël Allegrini	Switzerland	27.62	Q
8	7	6	Henrique Fonseca	Brazil	27.64	Q
9	5	3	Vojtěch Janeček	Czech Republic	27.73	Q
10	6	1	Park Geon	South Korea	27.74	Q
11	5	4	Andrew Goh	Malaysia	27.85	Q
12	5	6	Guilherme Camossato	Brazil	27.91	Q
13	7	1	Jeremias Pock	Germany	27.92	Q
14	6	7	Nicholas Cheung	Hong Kong	27.93	Q
15	4	2	Christopher Palvadre	Estonia	27.98	Q
16	7	2	Linus Forsgren	Sweden	28.00	Q
17	7	5	Carl Aït Kaci	France	28.01	
17	6	2	Adam Mak	Hong Kong	28.01	
19	5	2	Matěj Zábojník	Czech Republic	28.12	
20	3	6	Albas Myrzamuratov	Kazakhstan	28.19	
21	6	8	Panayiotis Panaretos	Cyprus	28.23	
22	4	5	Benjamin Delmar	United States	28.25	
23	2	5	Vidith Shankar	India	28.36	
24	5	8	Markos Iakovidis	Cyprus	28.39	
25	4	6	Matthew Randle	South Africa	28.49	
26	7	8	Artur Mironov	Kazakhstan	28.61	
27	3	4	Kristaps Miķelsons	Latvia	28.72	
28	4	1	Yadesh Mandey	India	28.75	
29	4	7	Gabriel Foo	Singapore	28.79	
30	4	3	Brayden Taivassalo	Canada	28.87	
31	3	5	Phillip Osadský	Slovakia	28.90	
31	5	1	Denis Șveț	Moldova	28.90	
33	2	6	Artjom Alteberg	Estonia	28.99	
34	3	2	Nicholas Cheong	Singapore	29.04	
35	3	1	Erik Hrovat	Slovenia	29.09	
36	3	3	Jaš Berložnik	Slovenia	29.13	
37	4	8	Finn Kemp	Luxembourg	29.17	
38	3	8	Christian Ryan	Great Britain	29.27	
39	4	4	Iskandar Sadullaev	Uzbekistan	29.29	
40	2	4	Ashot Chakhoyan	Armenia	29.30	
41	2	3	Aleksandre Eradze	Georgia	29.39	
42	3	7	Rihards Kahanovičs	Latvia	29.79	
43	2	2	Lasha Mindiashvili	Georgia	29.90	
44	2	8	Said Hamidov	Azerbaijan	30.19	
45	1	5	Rashad Alguliyev	Azerbaijan	30.20	
46	2	7	Derek Velasco	Ecuador	30.32	
47	2	1	Roman Berkovich	Uzbekistan	30.69	
48	1	6	Chong Ioi Lam	Macau	30.99	
49	1	1	Gunbilig Tsevegsguren	Mongolia	31.51	
50	1	3	Daniel Caicedo	Ecuador	31.82	
51	1	4	John Kimuli	Uganda	32.39	
52	1	7	Gianluca Bertotto	Argentina	32.90	
53	1	2	Eyad Al-Siyabi	Oman	34.64	
54	1	8	Khangal Dayartsengel	Mongolia	35.61	

=== Semifinals ===
The 16 advancing swimmers were split into two semifinal heats of 8 during the evening session. The swimmers recording the top 8 fastest times advanced to the final round.

Rank	Heat	Lane	Swimmer	Nation	Time	Notes
1	2	4	Federico Rizzardi	Italy	27.28	Q
2	2	5	Reo Okura	Japan	27.42	Q
3	2	1	Jeremias Pock	Germany	27.53	Q
4	2	2	Vojtěch Janeček	Czech Republic	27.68	Q
5	1	5	Nathaniel Germonprez	United States	27.71	Q
6	1	3	Dawid Wiekiera	Poland	27.73	Q
7	1	6	Henrique Fonseca	Brazil	27.81	Q
8	1	4	Archie Goodburn	Great Britain	27.82	Q
9	2	8	Christopher Palvadre	Estonia	27.83	
10	1	7	Guilherme Camossato	Brazil	27.84	
11	2	7	Andrew Goh	Malaysia	27.90	
12	2	3	Flavio Mangiameli	Italy	27.92	
13	1	8	Linus Forsgren	Sweden	28.00	
14	2	6	Maël Allegrini	Switzerland	28.05	
15	1	2	Park Geon	South Korea	28.09	
16	1	1	Nicholas Cheung	Hong Kong	28.21	

=== Final ===
The fastest 8 swimmers competed in a single race to determine the gold, silver and bronze medalists.

Rank	Lane	Swimmer	Nation	Time	Notes
1st place, gold medalist(s)	4	Federico Rizzardi	Italy	27.14	
2nd place, silver medalist(s)	5	Reo Okura	Japan	27.33	
3rd place, bronze medalist(s)	7	Dawid Wiekiera	Poland	27.46	
4	2	Nathaniel Germonprez	United States	27.55	
5	3	Jeremias Pock	Germany	27.65	
6	1	Henrique Fonseca	Brazil	27.69	
7	8	Archie Goodburn	Great Britain	27.73	
8	6	Vojtěch Janeček	Czech Republic	27.74	
