= Badminton at the 2025 Summer World University Games – Women's singles =

Women's singles at the 2025 Summer World University Games
- Venue: Westenergie Sporthalle
- Location: Mülheim, Germany
- Dates: 22–26 July 2025
- Competitors: 71 from 39 nations

Medalists
| gold medal | Thamonwan Nithiittikrai (THA) |
| silver medal | Tidapron Kleebyeesun (THA) |
| bronze medal | Wong Ling Ching (MAS) |
| bronze medal | Ella Lin (USA) |

The women's singles badminton event at the 2025 Summer World University Games was held from 22 to 26 July at the Westenergie Sporthalle in Mülheim, Germany. A total of 71 competitors from 39 nations participated in the event.

== Seeds ==
1. Tidapron Kleebyeesun (THA) (final)
2. Huang Ching-ping (TPE) (quarter-finals)
3. Thamonwan Nithiittikrai (THA) (champion)
4. Wong Ling Ching (MAS) (semi-finals)
5. Saloni Mehta (HKG) (fourth round)
6. Devika Sihag (IND) (quarter-finals)
7. Chloe Hoang (CAN) (fourth round)
8. Miranda Wilson (GER) (third round)

9. Milena Schnider (SUI) (third round)
10. Siti Zulaikha (MAS) (fourth round)
11. Romane Cloteaux-Foucault (FRA) (fourth round)
12. Aditi Bhatt (IND) (fourth round)
13. Wang Pei-yu (TPE) (second round)
14. Fadilah Mohamed Rafi (UGA) (fourth round)
15. Lee So-yul (KOR) (fourth round)
16. Sofiia Lavrova (UKR) (quarter-finals)

Click on the seed number of a player to go to their draw section.

== Draw ==
The draw published on 21 July 2025.

=== Finals ===
Quarterfinals
1 | Tidapron Kleebyeesun (THA) | 15 | 15
16 | Sofiia Lavrova (UKR) | 12 | 4
4 | Wong Ling Ching (MAS) | 17 | 15
6 | Devika Sihag (IND) | 15 | 11
Choi Hyo-won (KOR) | 15 | 14 | 11
3 | Thamonwan Nithiittikrai (THA) | 7 | 16 | 15
Ella Lin (USA) | 15 | 15
2 | Huang Ching-ping (TPE) | 8 | 10

Semifinals
1 | Tidapron Kleebyeesun (THA) | 14 | 15 | 15
4 | Wong Ling Ching (MAS) | 16 | 15 | 13
3 | Thamonwan Nithiittikrai (THA) | 15 | 15
Ella Lin (USA) | 5 | 12

Final
1 | Tidapron Kleebyeesun (THA) | 20 | 7 | 8
3 | Thamonwan Nithiittikrai (THA) | 18 | 15 | 15

=== Top half ===
==== Section 1 ====
First round

Second round
1 | T Kleebyeesun (THA) | 15 | 15
D Choo (SGP) | 5 | 4
J Wu (SGP) | 8 | 15 | 10
Pui C W (MAC) | 15 | 7 | 15
12 | A Bhatt (IND) | 15 | 15
D Odijk (NED) | 10 | 7
S Danial (SGP) | 15 | 17
N Tomčová (SVK) | 8 | 15

Third round
1 | T Kleebyeesun (THA) | 15 | 15
Pui C W (MAC) | 3 | 9
12 | A Bhatt (IND) | 15 | 15
S Danial (SGP) | 6 | 6

Fourth round
1 | T Kleebyeesun (THA) | 15 | 15
12 | A Bhatt (IND) | 8 | 11

==== Section 2 ====
First round
D Jumadilova (KAZ) | 4 | 6
C Teruel (ESP) | 15 | 15

Second round
7 | C Hoang (CAN) | 15 | 15
A Nóvoa (ESP) | 4 | 4
K Wangmo (BHU) | 2 | 1
Y Kobayashi (JPN) | 15 | 15
16 | S Lavrova (UKR) | 15 | 15
K Rabie (EGY) | 4 | 7
V Yang (USA) | 13 | 15 | 15
C Teruel (ESP) | 15 | 12 | 17

Third round
7 | C Hoang (CAN) | 15 | 16
Y Kobayashi (JPN) | 11 | 14
16 | S Lavrova (UKR) | 15 | 15
C Teruel (ESP) | 7 | 8

Fourth round
7 | C Hoang (CAN) | 15 | 9 | 13
16 | S Lavrova (UKR) | 11 | 15 | 15

==== Section 3 ====
First round
N Samadova (AZE) | 13 | 10
J Amanda (SRI) | 15 | 15

Second round
4 | Wong L C (MAS) | 15 | 15
S Go (AUS) | 6 | 7
P Choden (BHU) | 4 | 0^{r}
W Górniak (POL) | 15 | 0
10 | S Zulaikha (MAS) | 15 | 15
M Mukuka (ZAM) | 2 | 2
S Vidanage (SRI) | 15 | 15
J Amanda (SRI) | 9 | 10

Third round
4 | Wong L C (MAS) | 15 | 15
W Górniak (POL) | 6 | 8
10 | S Zulaikha (MAS) | 15 | 15
S Vidanage (SRI) | 10 | 9

Fourth round
4 | Wong L C (MAS) | 15 | 15
10 | S Zulaikha (MAS) | 3 | 12

==== Section 4 ====
First round
A Alymova (UKR) | 15 | 15
E Haber (MLT) | 11 | 2

Second round
6 | D Sihag (IND) | 15 | 15
C Obasanmi (NGR) | 4 | 4
O Kadlecová (SVK) | 15 | 15
A Nepal (NEP) | 2 | 7
15 | Lee S-y (KOR) | 15 | 15
L Malynich (CAM) | 6 | 7
N Chi (USA) | 15 | 15
A Alymova (UKR) | 13 | 11

Third round
6 | D Sihag (IND) | 15 | 15
O Kadlecová (SVK) | 8 | 10
15 | Lee S-y (KOR) | 16 | 15
N Chi (USA) | 14 | 5

Fourth round
6 | D Sihag (IND) | 15 | 0
15 | Lee S-y (KOR) | 10 | 0^{r}

=== Bottom half ===
==== Section 5 ====
First round
S Nakahara (JPN) | 15 | 9 | 15
A Yu (CAN) | 7 | 15 | 11

Second round
S Nakahara (JPN) | 12 | 15 | 10
Choi H-w (KOR) | 15 | 9 | 15
T Takács (HUN) | 9 | 4
9 | M Schnider (SUI) | 15 | 15
N Subba (NEP) | 1 | 2
E Zhang (CAN) | 15 | 15
Š Alič (SLO) | 6 | 5
5 | S Mehta (HKG) | 15 | 15

Third round
Choi H-w (KOR) | 16 | 20
9 | M Schnider (SUI) | 14 | 18
E Zhang (CAN) | 15 | 11 | 13
5 | S Mehta (HKG) | 7 | 15 | 15

Fourth round
Choi H-w (KOR) | 18 | 16 | 15
5 | S Mehta (HKG) | 20 | 14 | 6

==== Section 6 ====
First round
Ng T Y (HKG) | 15 | 15
P Onyango (AIN) | 3 | 3

Second round
Ng T Y (HKG) | 18 | 15
YL Zhang (AUS) | 16 | 7
A Imaizumi (JPN) | 15 | 15
13 | Wang P-y (TPE) | 2 | 8
J Abdelkader (EGY) | 9 | 18 | 13
H Nuriyeva (AZE) | 15 | 16 | 15
K Nalumansi (UGA) | 5 | 2
3 | T Nithiittikrai (THA) | 15 | 15

Third round
Ng T Y (HKG) | 17 | 9
A Imaizumi (JPN) | 19 | 15
H Nuriyeva (AZE) | 5 | 9
3 | T Nithiittikrai (THA) | 15 | 15

Fourth round
A Imaizumi (JPN) | 6 | 13
3 | T Nithiittikrai (THA) | 15 | 15

==== Section 7 ====
First round
T Korkmaz (TUR) | 15 | 11 | 15
A Ywata (BRA) | 11 | 15 | 8

Second round
T Korkmaz (TUR) | 15 | 12 | 15
Ieong S K (MAC) | 9 | 15 | 13
A Zhumabek (KAZ) | 8 | 10
14 | F M Rafi (UGA) | 15 | 15
A Ladiana (PHI) | 5 | 5
E Lin (USA) | 15 | 15
K Kawthar (KSA) | 5 | 11
8 | M Wilson (GER) | 15 | 15

Third round
T Korkmaz (TUR) | 15 | 11 | 13
14 | F M Rafi (UGA) | 10 | 15 | 15
E Lin (USA) | 15 | 15
8 | M Wilson (GER) | 9 | 8

Fourth round
14 | F M Rafi (UGA) | 5 | 3
E Lin (USA) | 15 | 15

==== Section 8 ====
First round
F Clark (MLT) | 2 | 11
A Ramírez (ESP) | 15 | 15

Second round
A Ramírez (ESP) | 4 | 3
U Volskaya (POL) | 15 | 15
N Wandili (AIN) | 5 | 8
11 | R Cloteaux-Foucault (FRA) | 15 | 15
A Tan (NED) | 10 | 2
Yuan AQ (CHN) | 15 | 15
Dai QY (CHN) | 11 | 13
2 | Huang C-p (TPE) | 15 | 15

Third round
U Volskaya (POL) | 13 | 9
11 | R Cloteaux-Foucault (FRA) | 15 | 15
Yuan AQ (CHN) | 12 | 15 | 12
2 | Huang C-p (TPE) | 15 | 13 | 15

Fourth round
11 | R Cloteaux-Foucault (FRA) | 6 | 8^{r}
2 | Huang C-p (TPE) | 15 | 13
