= Swimming at the 2025 Summer World University Games – Women's 50 metre butterfly =

Women's 50 metre butterfly at the 2025 Summer World University Games
- Venue: Schwimm- und Sprunghalle im Europasportpark
- Location: Berlin
- Dates: 17 July (heats and semifinals); 18 July (final)
- Competitors: 49 from 33 nations

Medalists
| gold medal | Daryna Nabojčenko | Czech Republic |
| silver medal | Josephine Crimmins | Australia |
| bronze medal | Viola Scotto di Carlo | Italy |

The women's 50 metre butterfly at the 2025 Summer World University Games in Rhine-Ruhr, Germany was held from 17 to 18 July 2025. Daryna Nabojčenko from Czech Republic won the gold medal, Josephine Crimmins from Australia took the silver medal and Viola Scotto di Carlo from Italy earned the bronze medal.

== Schedule ==
All times are Central European Time (UTC+1)

| Date | Time | Round |
|---|---|---|
| 17 July | 09:34 | Heats |
| 17 July | 19:10 | Semifinals |
| 18 July | 19:36 | Final |

== Records ==
Prior to the competition, the world and Universiade records were as follows.

| Category | Swimmer | Record | Date | Place | Event |
|---|---|---|---|---|---|
| World record | (Sweden) Sarah Sjöström | 24.43 | 5 July 2014 | Borås, Sweden | 2014 Swedish Championships |
| Universiade record | (China) Zhang Yufei | 25.20 | 2 August 2023 | Chengdu, China | 2021 Summer World University Games |

== Results ==
=== Heats ===
All entered athletes competed across multiple seeded heats in the morning session. Swimmers with the top 16 fastest times advanced, regardless of which individual heat they swam.

| Rank | Heat | Lane | Swimmer | Nation | Time | Notes |
|---|---|---|---|---|---|---|
| 1 | 5 | 5 | Josephine Crimmins | Australia | 26.33 | Q |
| 2 | 7 | 4 | Daryna Nabojčenko | Czech Republic | 26.40 | Q |
| 3 | 5 | 4 | Viola Scotto di Carlo | Italy | 26.50 | Q |
| 4 | 7 | 6 | Kalia Antoniou | Cyprus | 26.59 | Q |
| 5 | 6 | 4 | Caroline Larsen | United States | 26.61 | Q |
| 6 | 7 | 5 | Ella Welch | United States | 26.67 | Q |
| 7 | 5 | 3 | Ciara Schlosshan | Great Britain | 26.71 | Q |
| 8 | 6 | 6 | Julia Ullmann | Switzerland | 26.83 | Q |
| 8 | 5 | 2 | Beatrix Tankó | Hungary | 26.83 | Q |
| 10 | 7 | 2 | Mariana Cunha | Portugal | 26.93 | Q |
| 11 | 6 | 3 | Paulina Cierpiałowska | Poland | 26.94 | Q |
| 12 | 6 | 7 | Chiu Yi-chen | Chinese Taipei | 26.98 | Q |
| 13 | 6 | 2 | Britta Koehorst | Netherlands | 27.01 | Q |
| 14 | 6 | 5 | Julia Maik | Poland | 27.02 | Q |
| 15 | 7 | 7 | Yeo Chiok Sze | Singapore | 27.16 | Q |
| 16 | 7 | 3 | Rita Pignatiello | Italy | 27.18 | Q |
| 17 | 1 | 5 | Ieva Maļuka | Latvia | 27.25 | |
| 18 | 6 | 8 | Poppy Stephen | Australia | 27.32 | |
| 19 | 7 | 1 | Ju U-yeong | South Korea | 27.44 | |
| 20 | 5 | 1 | Angélique Brugger | Switzerland | 27.45 | |
| 21 | 6 | 1 | Liu Pei-yin | Chinese Taipei | 27.48 | |
| 22 | 5 | 6 | Paula Juste | Spain | 27.71 | |
| 23 | 5 | 7 | Zora Ripková | Slovakia | 27.89 | |
| 24 | 5 | 8 | Kiia Metsäkonkola | Finland | 28.03 | |
| 25 | 7 | 8 | Yang Ha-jung | South Korea | 28.06 | |
| 26 | 4 | 5 | Varsenik Manucharyan | Armenia | 28.12 | |
| 27 | 4 | 3 | Jenna Pulkkinen | Finland | 28.13 | |
| 28 | 4 | 4 | Tia Primc | Slovenia | 28.17 | |
| 29 | 4 | 6 | Kate Meyer | South Africa | 28.21 | |
| 30 | 4 | 2 | Nina Venkatesh | India | 28.43 | |
| 31 | 4 | 8 | Fabienne Pavlik | Austria | 28.89 | |
| 32 | 3 | 5 | María Contreras | Ecuador | 29.11 | |
| 33 | 4 | 1 | Fernanda Reyes | Chile | 29.21 | |
| 34 | 3 | 3 | Snigdha Ghosh | India | 29.24 | |
| 35 | 2 | 2 | Aixa Recchioni | Argentina | 29.40 | |
| 36 | 3 | 6 | Kayley Goh | Singapore | 29.43 | |
| 37 | 3 | 2 | Kuok Hei Cheng | Macau | 29.61 | |
| 38 | 3 | 4 | Heleriin Haljaste | Estonia | 30.02 | |
| 39 | 3 | 8 | Kuan I Cheng | Macau | 30.15 | |
| 40 | 2 | 6 | Eliane Saade | Lebanon | 30.32 | |
| 41 | 3 | 7 | Florencia Orpis | Chile | 30.41 | |
| 42 | 1 | 3 | Fatima Alkaramova | Azerbaijan | 30.57 | |
| 43 | 3 | 1 | Kristiāna Maskava-Pudāne | Latvia | 30.62 | |
| 44 | 2 | 7 | Laeticia Hamdoun | Lebanon | 31.26 | |
| 45 | 2 | 4 | Eliana Martini | Argentina | 31.74 | |
| 46 | 2 | 3 | Seneshi Herath | Sri Lanka | 32.08 | |
| 47 | 1 | 4 | Erkhes Gansuld | Mongolia | 32.18 | |
| 48 | 2 | 5 | Desire Minchala | Ecuador | 32.42 | |
| — | 4 | 7 | Paige van der Westhuizen | Zimbabwe | DNS | |

=== Semifinals ===
The 16 advancing swimmers were split into two semifinal heats of 8 during the evening session. The swimmers recording the top 8 fastest times advanced to the final round.

| Rank | Heat | Lane | Swimmer | Nation | Time | Notes |
|---|---|---|---|---|---|---|
| 1 | 2 | 3 | Caroline Larsen | United States | 26.06 | Q |
| 2 | 2 | 5 | Viola Scotto di Carlo | Italy | 26.16 | Q |
| 3 | 1 | 4 | Daryna Nabojčenko | Czech Republic | 26.24 | Q |
| 4 | 2 | 4 | Josephine Crimmins | Australia | 26.27 | Q |
| 5 | 1 | 3 | Ella Welch | United States | 26.48 | Q |
| 6 | 1 | 5 | Kalia Antoniou | Cyprus | 26.51 | Q |
| 7 | 2 | 6 | Ciara Schlosshan | Great Britain | 26.54 | Q |
| 8 | 1 | 6 | Julia Ullmann | Switzerland | 26.55 | Q |
| 9 | 2 | 1 | Britta Koehorst | Netherlands | 26.73 | |
| 10 | 1 | 1 | Julia Maik | Poland | 26.77 | |
| 11 | 1 | 2 | Mariana Cunha | Portugal | 26.78 | |
| 11 | 1 | 7 | Chiu Yi-chen | Chinese Taipei | 26.78 | |
| 13 | 2 | 2 | Beatrix Tankó | Hungary | 26.80 | |
| 14 | 2 | 7 | Paulina Cierpiałowska | Poland | 26.89 | |
| 15 | 1 | 8 | Rita Pignatiello | Italy | 26.97 | |
| 16 | 2 | 8 | Yeo Chiok Sze | Singapore | 27.08 | |

=== Final ===
The fastest 8 swimmers competed in a single race to determine the gold, silver and bronze medalists.

| Rank | Lane | Swimmer | Nation | Time | Notes |
|---|---|---|---|---|---|
| 1st place, gold medalist(s) | 3 | Daryna Nabojčenko | Czech Republic | 26.09 | |
| 2nd place, silver medalist(s) | 6 | Josephine Crimmins | Australia | 26.27 | |
| 3rd place, bronze medalist(s) | 5 | Viola Scotto di Carlo | Italy | 26.30 | |
| 4 | 4 | Caroline Larsen | United States | 26.39 | |
| 5 | 2 | Ella Welch | United States | 26.48 | |
| 6 | 1 | Ciara Schlosshan | Great Britain | 26.59 | |
| 7 | 8 | Julia Ullmann | Switzerland | 26.69 | |
| 8 | 7 | Kalia Antoniou | Cyprus | 26.79 | |
