= Badminton at the 2025 Summer World University Games – Men's singles =

Men's singles at the 2025 Summer World University Games
- Venue: Westenergie Sporthalle
- Location: Mülheim, Germany
- Dates: 22 July 2025 – 26 July 2025
- Competitors: 76 from 40 nations

Medalists
gold medal	Ting Yen-chen (TPE)
silver medal	Enogat Roy (FRA)
bronze medal	Rei Miyashita (JPN)
bronze medal	Zhou Xinyu (CHN)

The men's singles badminton event at the 2025 Summer World University Games was held from 22 to 26 July at the Westenergie Sporthalle in Mülheim, Germany.

== Draw ==
The draw published on 22 July 2025.

=== Finals ===
Quarter-finals
Rei Miyashita (JPN)	15	11	15
Wang Zijun (CHN)	8	15	11
Choi Ji-hoon (KOR)	15	6	13
Enogat Roy (FRA)	8	15	15
Zhou Xinyu (CHN)	13	15	16
Matthias Kicklitz (GER)	15	13	14
Eogene Ewe (MAS)	13	14
Ting Yen-chen (TPE)	15	16

Semi-finals
Rei Miyashita (JPN)	15	12	8
Enogat Roy (FRA)	13	15	15
Zhou Xinyu (CHN)	7	6
Ting Yen-chen (TPE)	15	15

Final
Enogat Roy (FRA)	8	5
Ting Yen-chen (TPE)	15	15

=== Top half ===
==== Section 1 ====
First round
E Melleri (FIN)	15	15
D Orara (PHI)	2	3

Second round
Su L-y (TPE)	15	15
T Punchihewa (SRI)	3	3
I Nicolussi (AUT)	10	11
R Miyashita (JPN)	15	15
D Pujari (IND)	15	12	15
M Shaikh (KSA)	6	15	5
K Khanal (NEP)	10	11
E Melleri (FIN)	15	15

Third round
Su L-y (TPE)	15	15
R Miyashita (JPN)	17	17
D Pujari (IND)	15	15
E Melleri (FIN)	11	13

Fourth round
R Miyashita (JPN)	17	15
D Pujari (IND)	15	5

==== Section 2 ====
First round
G Alič (SLO)	9	9
S Rikreay (CAM)	15	15
Wang C (HKG)	15	15
A Malla (NEP)	9	4

Second round
Kok J H (MAS)	15	15
M Lim (SGP)	9	7
B Ongeche (AIN)	3	6
S Rikreay (CAM)	15	15
Wang ZJ (CHN)	15	15
A Sardar (KSA)	4	6
K Chong (USA)	9	5
Wang C (HKG)	15	15

Third round
Kok J H (MAS)	15	15
S Rikreay (CAM)	6	6
Wang ZJ (CHN)	15	15
Wang C (HKG)	12	13

Fourth round
Kok J H (MAS)	10	15
Wang ZJ (CHN)	15	17

==== Section 3 ====
First round
Vong K W (MAC)	13	11
O Sakurai (JPN)	15	15

Second round
P Teeraratsakul (THA)	15	15
F Onchiri (AIN)	4	8
Choi J-h (KOR)	15	15
V Vath (CAM)	4	8
Á Leal (ESP)	15	15
V Reva (UKR)	10	10
O Steven (NGR)	6	12
O Sakurai (JPN)	15	15

Third round
P Teeraratsakul (THA)	8	15	12
Choi J-h (KOR)	15	10	15
Á Leal (ESP)	11	18	15
O Sakurai (JPN)	15	16	17

Fourth round
Choi J-h (KOR)	15	15
O Sakurai (JPN)	9	7

==== Section 4 ====
First round
D Shcherbatiuk (UKR)	15	15
H Tan (CAN)	12	10
J Abo (UGA)	4	5
J Wilcazk (POL)	15	15

Second round
E Roy (FRA)	15	15
T M Phang (SGP)	7	10
A Pradhan (BHU)	8	2
D Shcherbatiuk (UKR)	15	15
S Dayanand (IND)	15	15
Ł Cimosz (POL)	8	13
A Gabilov (AZE)	6	10
J Wilcazk (POL)	15	15

Third round
E Roy (FRA)	15	15
D Shcherbatiuk (UKR)	9	7
S Dayanand (IND)	15	15
J Wilcazk (POL)	4	2

Fourth round
E Roy (FRA)	15	15
S Dayanand (IND)	13	13

=== Bottom half ===
==== Section 5 ====
First round
S Suchý (SVK)	6	7
Zhou XY (CHN)	15	15
K Masumoto (JPN)	15	15
M Tajibullayev (KAZ)	9	5

Second round
Zhou XY (CHN)	15	15
M Shabanzade (AZE)	3	2
S W Li (USA)	8	10
T Lock (CAN)	15	15
K Masumoto (JPN)	16	15	15
M Esteve (ESP)	18	11	12
A B Umar (NGR)	8	7
D Panarin (KAZ)	15	15

Third round
Zhou XY (CHN)	15	8	15
T Lock (CAN)	7	15	8
K Masumoto (JPN)	15	15
D Panarin (KAZ)	10	8

Fourth round
Zhou XY (CHN)	7	15	15
K Masumoto (JPN)	15	11	12

==== Section 6 ====
First round
R K Anandas (IND)	15	13	17
A Ooi (AUS)	13	15	15

Second round
R K Anandas (IND)	15	15
Pui C C (MAC)	9	10
Bálint Pápai (HUN)	10	4
K-Y Oei (GER)	15	15
T Gatdula (PHI)	9	5
S Kadlec (SVK)	15	15
T de Silva (SRI)	12	5
M Kicklitz (GER)	15	15

Third round
R K Anandas (IND)	15	15
K-Y Oei (GER)	9	8
S Kadlec (SVK)	8	9
M Kicklitz (GER)	15	15

Fourth round
R K Anandas (IND)	15	16	9
M Kicklitz (GER)	7	18	15

==== Section 7 ====
First round
A Niczyporuk (POL)	15	15
Balázs Pápai (HUN)	12	10
Sim J B (SGP)	5	12
D Oliveira (BRA)	15	15

Second round
A Niczyporuk (POL)	9	19
N Saraç (TUR)	15	21
R Ma (USA)	7	10
W Wongsup-in (THA)	15	15
D Oliveira (BRA)	15	11	15
Ko S H (HKG)	8	15	11
R Dorji (BHU)	4	4
E Ewe (MAS)	15	15

Third round
N Saraç (TUR)	7	9
W Wongsup-in (THA)	15	15
D Oliveira (BRA)	8	9
E Ewe (MAS)	15	15

Fourth round
W Wongsup-in (THA)	12	9
E Ewe (MAS)	15	15

==== Section 8 ====
First round
Ao F L (MAC)	15	15
R Pavlík (SVK)	7	6

Second round
Ao F L (MAC)	16	8	15
L Kros (NED)	14	15	17
S Cassar (MLT)	6	6
Ting Y-c (TPE)	15	15
P Poho (ZAM)	4	5
K Ezzat (EGY)	15	15
Park S-h (KOR)	6	3
V Lai (CAN)	15	15

Third round
L Kros (NED)	3	5
Ting Y-c (TPE)	15	15
K Ezzat (EGY)	5	6
V Lai (CAN)	15	15

Fourth round
Ting Y-c (TPE)	18	15
V Lai (CAN)	16	12
