= Athletics at the 2021 Summer World University Games – Women's 800 metres =

The women's 800 metres event at the 2021 Summer World University Games was held on 2 and 3 August 2023 at the Shuangliu Sports Centre Stadium in Chengdu, China.

== Medalists ==
Gold	Silver	Bronze
Laura Pellicoro; Italy	Knight Aciru; Uganda	Charne Swart; South Africa

== Results ==
=== Round 1 ===
Qualification: First 3 in each heat (Q) and the next 2 fastest (q) advance to final.

Rank	Heat	Name	Nationality	Time	Notes
1	1	Margarita Koczanowa	Poland	2:06.07	Q
2	1	Laura Pellicoro	Italy	2:06.32	Q
3	1	Wu Hongjiao	China	2:06.99	Q
4	1	Malin Nyfors	Norway	2:07.13	q
5	1	Michaela Oosthuizen	South Africa	2:07.24	q
6	2	Knight Aciru	Uganda	2:07.25	Q
7	2	Charne Swart	South Africa	2:07.37	Q
8	2	Veronica Vancardo	Switzerland	2:07.66	Q
9	2	Amanda Frøynes	Norway	2:08.19	
10	1	Marvarious Orishaba	Uganda	2:08.22	PB
11	2	Rokia Mouici	Algeria	2:08.86	
12	1	Gabriella Szabó	Hungary	2:10.26	
13	1	Laxita Sandilea	India	2:10.50	
14	2	Wu Chunling	China	2:14.34	
15	2	Soudi-Thasmy Moussa	Comoros	2:54.72	
–	2	Klara Andrijašević	Croatia	DNS	

=== Final ===
Rank	Name	Nationality	Time	Notes
1st place, gold medalist(s)	Laura Pellicoro	Italy	2:04.20	
2nd place, silver medalist(s)	Knight Aciru	Uganda	2:04.34	SB
3rd place, bronze medalist(s)	Charne Swart	South Africa	2:04.73	
4	Margarita Koczanowa	Poland	2:04.86	
5	Michaela Oosthuizen	South Africa	2:06.26	PB
6	Veronica Vancardo	Switzerland	2:07.13	
7	Wu Hongjiao	China	2:07.30	
8	Malin Nyfors	Norway	2:08.58	
