= Archery at the 2025 Summer World University Games – Mixed team recurve =

Mixed team recurve at the 2025 Summer World University Games
- Venue: Sportpark am Hallo (qualification); Zollverein Coal Mine Industrial Complex (finals)
- Location: Essen, Germany
- Dates: 22 – 26 July 2025
- Competitors: 33 from 66 nations

Medalists
gold medal	Liu Yanxiu; Wang Yan	China
silver medal	Waka Sonoda; Yuya Funahashi	Japan
bronze medal	Nam Su-hyeon; Seo Min-gi	South Korea

The mixed team recurve archery competition at the 2025 Summer World University Games was held at the Sportpark am Hallo and the Zollverein Coal Mine Industrial Complex in Essen, Germany from 22 to 26 July 2025.

== Records ==
Prior to the competition, the world and Universiade records were as follows.

- 144 arrows qualification round

Category	Team	Athlete	Score	Record	Date	Place	Event
World record	South Korea	Lee Woo-seok	696	1388	10 June 2019	's-Hertogenbosch, Netherlands	2019 World Archery Championships
World record	South Korea	Kang Chae-young	692	1388	10 June 2019	's-Hertogenbosch, Netherlands	2019 World Archery Championships
Universiade record	South Korea (KOR)	Lee Seung-yun	693	1379	4 July 2015	Gwangju, South Korea	2015 Summer Universiade
Universiade record	South Korea (KOR)	Ki Bo-bae	686	1379	4 July 2015	Gwangju, South Korea	2015 Summer Universiade

== Qualification round ==
The ranking round took place on 22 July 2025 to determine the seeding for the elimination rounds. It consisted of two rounds of 36 arrows, with a maximum score of 720.

Rank	Team	Athlete	Individual			Team		
Rank	Team	Athlete	Score	10+Xs	Xs	Total	10+Xs	Xs
1	South Korea	Nam Su-hyeon	664	27	10	1347	66	33
1	South Korea	Seo Min-gi	683	39	23	1347	66	33
2	United States	Catalina GNoriega	663	33	14	1328	65	24
2	United States	Trenton Cowles	665	32	10	1328	65	24
3	China	Liu Yanxiu	668	30	11	1326	57	23
3	China	Wang Yan	658	27	12	1326	57	23
4	Japan	Waka Sonoda	657	22	4	1322	56	15
4	Japan	Yuya Funahashi	665	34	11	1322	56	15
5	Chinese Taipei	Fong You-jhu	649	26	10	1316	57	25
5	Chinese Taipei	Tang Chih-chun	667	31	15	1316	57	25
6	France	Victoria Sebastian	649	25	5	1305	51	10
6	France	Jules Pedoux	656	26	5	1305	51	10
7	Germany	Johanna Klinger	649	26	7	1303	50	12
7	Germany	Moritz Wieser	654	24	5	1303	50	12
8	Italy	Roberta Di Francesco	631	17	5	1288	49	21
8	Italy	Matteo Borsani	657	32	16	1288	49	21
9	India	Basanti Mahato	647	19	7	1287	38	14
9	India	Aryan Rana	640	19	7	1287	38	14
10	Turkey	Gizem Özkan	634	19	4	1286	42	16
10	Turkey	Berkim Tümer	652	23	12	1286	42	16
11	Israel	Mikaella Moshe	620	17	8	1285	50	17
11	Israel	Roy Dror	665	33	9	1285	50	17
12	Malaysia	Ariana Zairi	642	27	9	1273	49	17
12	Malaysia	Akid Ezaidin	631	22	8	1273	49	17
13	Poland	Karina Kozłowska	626	18	2	1270	34	2
13	Poland	Maksymilian Osuch	644	16	0	1270	34	2
14	Slovakia	Denisa Baránková	644	27	9	1256	41	16
14	Slovakia	Daniel Medveczky	612	14	7	1256	41	16
15	Azerbaijan	Fatima Huseynli	618	12	4	1253	28	9
15	Azerbaijan	Mahammadali Aliyev	635	16	5	1253	28	9
16	Australia	Megan Denier	611	12	1	1250	32	8
16	Australia	Casey Isles	639	20	7	1250	32	8
17	Romania	Mădălina Amăistroaie	631	21	8	1249	34	14
17	Romania	Nectarios Condurache	618	13	6	1249	34	14
18	Great Britain	Megan Costall	621	13	5	1248	28	9
18	Great Britain	Callum Piggott	627	15	4	1248	28	9
19	Uzbekistan	Ziyodakhon Abdusattorova	642	26	7	1245	37	14
19	Uzbekistan	Utkirjon Hoshimov	603	11	7	1245	37	14
20	Slovenia	Zana Pintarič	639	15	6	1242	25	7
20	Slovenia	Martin Mihevc	603	10	1	1242	25	7
21	Belgium	Ella Vanlangenakker	577	11	4	1229	36	12
21	Belgium	Jarno De Smedt	652	25	8	1229	36	12
22	Ukraine	Iryna Tretiakova	639	18	4	1229	28	7
22	Ukraine	Artem Batrachenko	590	10	3	1229	28	7
23	Switzerland	Laura Amato	586	9	0	1227	32	7
23	Switzerland	Keziah Chabin	641	23	7	1227	32	7
24	San Marino	Giorgia Cesarini	625	19	7	1225	29	12
24	San Marino	Leonardo Tura	600	10	5	1225	29	12
25	Hong Kong	Poon Yuk Hei	599	9	5	1214	24	10
25	Hong Kong	Chu Pak Ho	615	15	5	1214	24	10
26	Moldova	Kasandra Berzan	606	14	7	1210	32	11
26	Moldova	Andrei Belici	604	18	4	1210	32	11
27	Canada	Natalee Chan	589	7	1	1205	23	5
27	Canada	Victor Chen	616	16	4	1205	23	5
28	New Zealand	Isabella Matthews	589	11	2	1196	25	3
28	New Zealand	Ben McLean	607	14	1	1196	25	3
29	Finland	Emmi Ala-Aho	615	17	4	1194	24	5
29	Finland	Niko Petäjä	579	7	1	1194	24	5
30	Latvia	Kintija Trinkūna	584	13	2	1186	25	4
30	Latvia	Gļebs Kononovs	602	12	2	1186	25	4
31	Estonia	Triinu Lilienthal	628	23	8	1174	30	10
31	Estonia	Rasmus Lõpp	546	7	2	1174	30	10
32	Sweden	Freya Andersson	578	9	0	1168	15	3
32	Sweden	Elias Olsson	590	6	3	1168	15	3
33	Singapore	Natalie Soo	564	6	2	1153	20	4
33	Singapore	Liew Zi Yang	589	14	2	1153	20	4

== Elimination round ==
The results are as below.

1/12 finals
17	Romania	2	36	36	31	36
16	Australia	6	32	37	37	37
9	India	6	37	36	37
24	San Marino	0	35	33	35
21	Belgium	0	35	32	35
12	Malaysia	6	39	36	36
13	Poland	4	36	36	32	37^{14}
20	Slovenia	5	37	35	39	35^{19}
19	Uzbekistan	1	37	36	33
14	Slovakia	5	37	38	37
11	Israel	6	36	36	35	37
22	Ukraine	2	38	25	34	34
23	Switzerland	0	37	31	36
10	Turkey	6	39	39	37
15	Azerbaijan	0	34	31	35
18	Great Britain	6	35	35	36

1/8 finals
1	South Korea	5	37	39	39
16	Australia	1	33	39	35
9	India	0	36	34	36
8	Italy	6	38	37	37
5	Chinese Taipei	5	38	36	35	37
12	Malaysia	3	36	36	36	35
20	Slovenia	0	33	37	32
4	Japan	6	38	40	34
3	China	5	40	35	35	36
14	Slovakia	4	39	34	36	38
11	Israel	0	33	36	36
6	France	6	35	39	38
7	Germany	5	38	37	39
10	Turkey	1	36	35	39
18	Great Britain	0	36	36	34
2	United States	6	38	39	39

Quarterfinals
1	South Korea	5	38	37	39
8	Italy	1	37	37	36
5	Chinese Taipei	3	36	37	36	37
4	Japan	5	40	35	38	37
3	China	6	37	36	39
6	France	0	36	35	38
7	Germany	1	35	38	37
2	United States	5	39	38	39

Semifinals
1	South Korea	0	37	39	37
4	Japan	6	38	40	39
3	China	5	36	38	37
2	United States	1	36	37	36

Final
4	Japan	2	34	35	36	34
3	China	6	33	39	39	35
Bronze medal match
1	South Korea	5	37	39	37
2	United States	1	37	32	35
