= Athletics at the 2021 Summer World University Games – Women's 1500 metres =

The women's 1500 metres event at the 2021 Summer World University Games was held on 4 and 6 August 2023 at the Shuangliu Sports Centre Stadium in Chengdu, China.

== Medalists ==
| Gold | Silver | Bronze |
|---|---|---|
| Laura Pellicoro; Italy | Vera Hoffmann; Luxembourg | Şilan Ayyıldız; Turkey |

== Results ==
=== Round 1 ===
Qualification: First six in each heat (Q) advance to final.

| Rank | Heat | Name | Nationality | Time | Notes |
|---|---|---|---|---|---|
| 1 | 1 | Weronika Lizakowska | Poland | 4:24.46 | Q |
| 2 | 1 | Knight Aciru | Uganda | 4:24.56 | Q |
| 3 | 1 | Nele Weßel | Germany | 4:24.74 | Q |
| 4 | 1 | Sarah Madeleine | France | 4:24.78 | Q |
| 5 | 1 | Saki Katagihara | Japan | 4:24.98 | Q |
| 6 | 1 | Abir Reffas | Algeria | 4:25.14 | Q |
| 7 | 1 | Amalie Sæten | Norway | 4:25.26 | |
| 8 | 2 | Laura Pellicoro | Italy | 4:26.88 | Q |
| 9 | 2 | Vera Hoffmann | Luxembourg | 4:27.25 | Q |
| 10 | 2 | Aleksandra Płocińska | Poland | 4:27.32 | Q |
| 11 | 1 | Simonay Weitsz | South Africa | 4:27.44 | |
| 12 | 2 | Fabiane Meyer | Germany | 4:27.46 | Q |
| 13 | 2 | Charné Swart | South Africa | 4:27.49 | Q |
| 14 | 2 | Şilan Ayyıldız | Turkey | 4:28.25 | Q |
| 15 | 2 | Roukia Mouici | Algeria | 4:29.03 | |
| 16 | 2 | Malin Edland | Norway | 4:30.23 | |
| 17 | 1 | Klara Andrijašević | Croatia | 4:32.40 | |
| 18 | 2 | Grace Ayozu | Uganda | 4:33.89 | |
| 19 | 2 | Hédi Heffner | Hungary | 4:35.45 | |
| 20 | 1 | Line Schulz | Denmark | 4:36.43 | |
| 21 | 2 | Laxita Sandilea | India | 4:36.51 | |
| 22 | 2 | Zhong Xiaoqian | China | 4:40.05 | SB |
| 23 | 1 | Patil Shivechha | India | 4:52.00 | |
| – | 1 | Tiana Huang-Cabrera | Northern Mariana Islands | DNS | |

=== Final ===
| Rank | Name | Nationality | Time | Notes |
|---|---|---|---|---|
| 1st place, gold medalist(s) | Laura Pellicoro | Italy | 4:15.82 | |
| 2nd place, silver medalist(s) | Vera Hoffmann | Luxembourg | 4:16.47 | |
| 3rd place, bronze medalist(s) | Şilan Ayyıldız | Turkey | 4:17.26 | |
| 4 | Weronika Lizakowska | Poland | 4:17.77 | |
| 5 | Saki Katagihara | Japan | 4:18.57 | |
| 6 | Sarah Madeleine | France | 4:18.95 | |
| 7 | Nele Weßel | Germany | 4:19.55 | |
| 8 | Knight Aciru | Uganda | 4:20.22 | |
| 9 | Charné Swart | South Africa | 4:20.50 | |
| 10 | Fabiane Meyer | Germany | 4:22.33 | |
| 11 | Abir Reffas | Algeria | 4:23.65 | |
| 12 | Aleksandra Płocińska | Poland | 4:23.88 | PB |
