= Wheelchair 3x3 basketball at the 2025 Summer World University Games – Men's tournament =

Men's wheelchair 3x3 tournament at the 2025 Summer World University Games
- Venue: Jahrhunderthalle
- Location: Bochum
- Dates: 17—20 July 2025
- Nations: 7

Medalists
gold medal	Spain
silver medal	Great Britain
bronze medal	United States

The men's wheelchair 3x3 tournament in basketball at the 2025 Summer Universiade in Rhine-Ruhr, Germany was held from 17 to 20 July 2025. This was the first edition of wheelchair 3x3 basketball at the Summer World University Games.

== Rosters ==
Seed	Team	Players			
1	Japan	Kento Haruta	Takuma Taniguchi	Masato Watanabe	Mitsuki Chino
2	Great Britain	James Hazell	Alexander Marshall-Wilson	Shayne Humphries	William Bishop
3	Germany	Luis Conrad	Luc Weilandt	Sören Seebold	Thomas Reier
4	United States	Jack Pierre	Joseph Rafter	Ryan Fitzpatrick	Martrell Stevens
5	Brazil	Mateus Kall	João Padilha	Herus Ferreira	Reyson Souza
6	Spain	Alejandro García	Pablo Lavandeira	Ignacio Ortega	Adrián García
7	Bulgaria	Atila Mutalib	Plamen Slavov	Anton Fikov	Nikola Hamchev

== Preliminary round ==
=== Group A ===
Pos	Team	Pld	W	L	PF	PA	PD	Qualification
1	United States	2	2	0	23	17	+6	Qualification for semifinals
2	Japan	2	1	1	15	17	−2	Qualification for quarterfinals
3	Brazil	2	0	2	16	20	−4	Qualification for quarterfinals

Source: rhineruhr2025

18 July 2025
12:20

Boxscore

Japan	8–6 (OT)	Brazil
Pts: Watanabe 4		Pts: Souza 4

Jahrhunderthalle, Bochum
Referees: Patricia Díez (ESP), Doris Korsman-Kaschmieder (NED)

18 July 2025
13:35

Boxscore

United States	12–10 (OT)	Brazil
Pts: Stevens 8		Pts: Padilha 6

Jahrhunderthalle, Bochum
Referees: Pierre Charrier (FRA), Veronica Restuccia (UAE)

18 July 2025
17:20

Boxscore

Japan	7–11	United States
Pts: Watanabe 4		Pts: Fitzpatrick 7

Jahrhunderthalle, Bochum
Referees: Pierre Charrier (FRA), Patricia Díez (ESP)

=== Group B ===
Pos	Team	Pld	W	L	PF	PA	PD	Qualification
1	Spain	3	3	0	50	16	+34	Qualification for semifinals
2	Great Britain	3	2	1	36	26	+10	Qualification for quarterfinals
3	Germany	3	1	2	30	30	0	Qualification for quarterfinals
4	Bulgaria	3	0	3	7	51	−44	

Source: rhineruhr2025

17 July 2025
12:20

Boxscore

Great Britain	19–3	Bulgaria
Pts: Marshall-Wilson 9		Pts: Fikov 3

Jahrhunderthalle, Bochum
Referees: Patricia Díez (ESP), Doris Korsman-Kaschmieder (NED)

17 July 2025
12:45

Boxscore

Germany	6–19	Spain
Pts: Reier 3		Pts: Ortega 7

Jahrhunderthalle, Bochum
Referees: Susan Nyambura Ndichu (KEN), Pedro Vásquez (CHI)

17 July 2025
16:00

Boxscore

Great Britain	9–16	Spain
Pts: Marshall-Wilson 4		Pts: García 6

Jahrhunderthalle, Bochum
Referees: Veronica Restuccia (UAE), Pedro Vásquez (CHI)

17 July 2025
16:25

Boxscore

Germany	17–3	Bulgaria
Pts: Reier 10		Pts: Fikov 2

Jahrhunderthalle, Bochum
Referees: Doris Korsman-Kaschmieder (NED), Susan Nyambura Ndichu (KEN)

18 July 2025
13:10

Boxscore

Great Britain	8–7	Germany
Pts: Hazell 4		Pts: Reier 7

Jahrhunderthalle, Bochum
Referees: Susan Nyambura Ndichu (KEN), Pedro Vásquez (CHI)

18 July 2025
18:35

Boxscore

Spain	15–1	Bulgaria
Pts: García 5		Pts: Fikov 1

Jahrhunderthalle, Bochum
Referees: Doris Korsman-Kaschmieder (NED), Susan Nyambura Ndichu (KEN)

== Knockout stage ==
=== Bracket ===
Quarterfinals
19 July
B2 Great Britain	18
A3 Brazil	10
19 July
A2 Japan	12
B3 Germany	11

Semifinals
20 July
A1 United States	3
B2 Great Britain	7
20 July
B1 Spain	17
A2 Japan	7

Final
20 July
B2 Great Britain	8
B1 Spain	11
3rd place
20 July
A1 United States	10
A2 Japan	6

=== Quarterfinals ===
19 July 2025
18:10

Boxscore

Japan	12–11	Germany
Pts: Chino 9		Pts: Reier 11

Jahrhunderthalle, Bochum
Referees: Susan Nyambura Ndichu (KEN), Pedro Vásquez (CHI)

19 July 2025
18:35

Boxscore

Great Britain	18–10	Brazil
Pts: Marshall-Wilson 13		Pts: Padilha 8

Jahrhunderthalle, Bochum
Referees: Pierre Charrier (FRA), Veronica Restuccia (UAE)

=== Semifinals ===
20 July 2025
10:50

Boxscore

United States	3–7	Great Britain
Pts: Pierre, Fitzpatrick, Stevens 1		Pts: Marshall-Wilson 4

Jahrhunderthalle, Bochum
Referees: Patricia Díez (ESP), Pedro Vásquez (CHI)

20 July 2025
11:15

Boxscore

Spain	17–7	Japan
Pts: Ortega 8		Pts: Taniguchi 4

Jahrhunderthalle, Bochum
Referees: Pierre Charrier (FRA), Doris Korsman-Kaschmieder (NED)

=== Bronze medal game ===
20 July 2025
14:40

Boxscore

United States	10–6	Japan
Pts: Stevens 5		Pts: Taniguchi, Watanabe, Chino 2

Jahrhunderthalle, Bochum
Referees: Patricia Díez (ESP), Veronica Restuccia (UAE)

=== Gold medal game ===
20 July 2025
16:40

Boxscore

Great Britain	8–11	Spain
Pts: Marshall-Wilson 4		Pts: García 8

Jahrhunderthalle, Bochum
Referees: Doris Korsman-Kaschmieder (NED), Pedro Vásquez (CHI)

== Final standings ==
Place	Team	Record
1st place, gold medalist(s)	Spain	5–0
2nd place, silver medalist(s)	Great Britain	4–2
3rd place, bronze medalist(s)	United States	3–1
4	Japan	2–3
5	Germany	1–3
6	Brazil	0–3
7	Bulgaria	0–3
