= Swimming at the 2025 Summer World University Games – Women's 100 metre butterfly =

Women's 100 metre butterfly at the 2025 Summer World University Games
- Venue: Schwimm- und Sprunghalle im Europasportpark
- Location: Berlin
- Dates: 20 July (heats and semifinals); 21 July (final)
- Competitors: 43 from 31 nations

Medalists
gold medal	Leah Shackley	United States
silver medal	Beatrix Tankó	Hungary
bronze medal	Josephine Crimmins	Australia

The women's 100 metre butterfly at the 2025 Summer World University Games in Rhine-Ruhr, Germany was held from 20 to 21 July 2025. Leah Shackley from the United States won the gold medal, Beatrix Tankó from Hungary took the silver medal and Josephine Crimmins from Australia earned the bronze medal.

== Schedule ==
All times are Central European Time (UTC+1)

Date	Time	Round
20 July	09:54	Heats
20 July	19:52	Semifinals
21 July	19:00	Final

== Records ==
Prior to the competition, the world and Universiade records were as follows.

Category	Swimmer	Record	Date	Place	Event
World record	(United States) Gretchen Walsh	54.60	3 May 2025	Fort Lauderdale, United States	2025 Pro Swim Series
Universiade record	(China) Zhang Yufei	56.57	5 August 2023	Chengdu, China	2021 Summer World University Games

== Results ==
=== Heats ===
All entered athletes competed across multiple seeded heats in the morning session. Swimmers with the top 16 fastest times advanced, regardless of which individual heat they swam.

Rank	Heat	Lane	Swimmer	Nation	Time	Notes
1	5	5	Ciara Schlosshan	Great Britain	58.65	Q
2	6	5	Josephine Crimmins	Australia	58.97	Q
3	6	4	Leah Shackley	United States	59.12	Q
4	6	6	Beatrix Tankó	Hungary	59.27	Q
5	4	4	Ella Welch	United States	59.43	Q
6	4	5	Uran Noda	Japan	59.44	Q
7	4	6	Julia Ullmann	Switzerland	59.47	Q
8	4	3	Paola Borrelli	Italy	59.80	Q
9	5	6	Julia Maik	Poland	59.91	Q
10	6	3	Mariana Cunha	Portugal	1:00.04	Q
11	5	3	Giulia Caprai	Italy	1:00.12	Q
12	6	2	Sarah Dumont	Belgium	1:00.16	Q
13	6	7	Poppy Stephen	Australia	1:00.36	Q
14	5	1	Gaia Rasmussen	Switzerland	1:00.52	Q
15	5	7	Liu Pei-yin	Chinese Taipei	1:00.64	Q
16	5	2	Gabriela Król	Poland	1:00.86	Q
17	4	7	Yeo Chiok Sze	Singapore	1:00.87	
18	1	5	Ieva Maļuka	Latvia	1:00.94	
19	6	1	Zora Ripková	Slovakia	1:01.30	
20	6	8	Varsenik Manucharyan	Armenia	1:01.35	
21	4	8	Tia Primc	Slovenia	1:01.59	
22	4	2	Yang Ha-jung	South Korea	1:01.63	
23	5	8	Gwinn Virginia	Chinese Taipei	1:01.93	
24	4	1	Fabienne Pavlik	Austria	1:02.01	
25	3	4	Leigh McMorran	South Africa	1:02.41	
26	2	1	Deniz Ertan	Turkey	1:02.42	
27	3	5	Paige van der Westhuizen	Zimbabwe	1:03.53	
28	3	6	Nina Venkatesh	India	1:04.49	
29	3	3	Weng Chi Cheang	Macau	1:04.81	
30	3	1	Belen Lahoz	Argentina	1:05.00	
31	3	2	Nilabjaa Ghosh	India	1:05.52	
32	2	3	Florencia Orpis	Chile	1:07.94	
33	3	7	Kuan I Cheng	Macau	1:08.50	
34	2	4	Trinidad Ardiles	Chile	1:08.82	
35	3	8	Heleriin Haljaste	Estonia	1:10.38	
36	2	6	Victoria Okumu	Kenya	1:10.80	
37	2	5	Seneshi Herath	Sri Lanka	1:11.84	
38	2	7	Desire Minchala	Ecuador	1:12.34	
39	2	8	Eliana Martini	Argentina	1:12.60	
40	1	6	Laeticia Hamdoun	Lebanon	1:13.58	
41	2	2	Dayanna Barreto	Ecuador	1:16.15	
42	1	3	Christelle Rouhana	Lebanon	1:18.55	
43	1	4	Erkhes Gansuld	Mongolia	1:19.91	

=== Semifinals ===
The 16 advancing swimmers were split into two semifinal heats of 8 during the evening session. The swimmers recording the top 8 fastest times advanced to the final round.

Rank	Heat	Lane	Swimmer	Nation	Time	Notes
1	1	4	Josephine Crimmins	Australia	58.42	Q
2	1	5	Beatrix Tankó	Hungary	58.54	Q
3	2	4	Ciara Schlosshan	Great Britain	58.67	Q
4	2	5	Leah Shackley	United States	58.72	Q
5	2	3	Ella Welch	United States	58.97	Q
6	2	6	Julia Ullmann	Switzerland	59.04	Q
7	1	6	Paola Borrelli	Italy	59.17	Q
8	1	2	Mariana Cunha	Portugal	59.30	Q
9	1	3	Uran Noda	Japan	59.75	
10	2	7	Giulia Caprai	Italy	59.88	
11	2	2	Julia Maik	Poland	59.96	
12	1	7	Sarah Dumont	Belgium	1:00.06	
13	2	1	Poppy Stephen	Australia	1:00.11	
14	1	8	Gabriela Król	Poland	1:00.52	
15	1	1	Gaia Rasmussen	Switzerland	1:00.57	
16	2	8	Liu Pei-yin	Chinese Taipei	1:00.75	

=== Final ===
The fastest 8 swimmers competed in a single race to determine the gold, silver and bronze medalists.

Rank	Lane	Swimmer	Nation	Time	Notes
1st place, gold medalist(s)	6	Leah Shackley	United States	58.16	
2nd place, silver medalist(s)	5	Beatrix Tankó	Hungary	58.55	
3rd place, bronze medalist(s)	4	Josephine Crimmins	Australia	58.62	
4	3	Ciara Schlosshan	Great Britain	58.74	
5	2	Ella Welch	United States	59.07	
6	1	Paola Borrelli	Italy	59.13	
7	7	Julia Ullmann	Switzerland	59.44	
8	8	Mariana Cunha	Portugal	59.65	
