= Nicolás Araya =

Chilean footballer

Personal information
- Full name: Nicolás Fernando Araya Bruna
- Date of birth: 6 June 1999 (age 27)
- Place of birth: La Serena, Chile
- Height: 1.74 m (5 ft 9 in)
- Position: Goalkeeper

Team information
- Current team: Deportes Concepción
- Number: 25

Youth career
- 2014–2015: Deportes Antofagasta

Senior career*
Years	Team	Apps	(Gls)
2015–2021	Deportes Antofagasta	0	(0)
2022	Colchagua	14	(0)
2023	General Velásquez	26	(0)
2024–	Deportes Concepción	61	(0)
- * Club domestic league appearances and goals as of 12 October 2026

Nicolás Fernando Araya Bruna (born 6 June 1999) is a Chilean footballer who plays as a goalkeeper for Chilean Primera División club Deportes Concepción.

== Club career ==
Born in La Serena, Chile, Araya joined the Deportes Antofagasta youth ranks at the age of 14. The next year, he was promoted to the first team.

In 2022 and 2023, Araya played for Colchagua in the Tercera A and General Velásquez in the Segunda División Profesional, respectively.

In January 2024, Araya signed with Deportes Concepción, winning the 2024 Segunda División Profesional de Chile. The next season, he got regularity and they got promotion to the 2026 Liga de Primera.

On 23 August 2026, Araya set the record of 615 minutes without conceding a goal for Deportes Concepción, breaking the previous record of 591 minutes held by Nicolás Villamil since 1989.

== International career ==
Araya was called up to Chile U20 in 2018.
