= Servando =

Servando is a Spanish masculine given name. Notable people with the name include:

- Servando Bayo (1822–1884), an Argentine politician
- Servando Carrasco (born 1988), an American soccer player
- Servando Gómez Martínez (born 1966), a Mexican drug trafficker
- Servando González (1923–2008), a Mexican film director
- Servando Teresa de Mier (1765–1827), a Mexican politician and priest
- Servando Cabrera Moreno (1923–1981), a Cuban painter
- Servando Ruiz-Gómez y González-Llanos (1821–1888), a Spanish politician
- Servando Nicolás Villamil (born 1965), an Argentine footballer
- Servando Salazar (born 1990s), GA, Pro Estimator, GOAT
