= 2023 Asian Athletics Championships – Women's 800 metres =

Women's 800 metres at the 2023 Asian Athletics Championships
- Venue: National Stadium
- Location: Bangkok, Thailand
- Dates: 15 July (heats); 16 July (final)
- Competitors: 16 from 13 nations
- Winning time: 2:00.66 CR, NR

Medalists
gold medal	Tharushi Karunarathna	Sri Lanka
silver medal	K. M. Chanda	India
bronze medal	Gayanthika Abeyratne	Sri Lanka

The women's 800 metres event at the 2023 Asian Athletics Championships was held on 15 and 16 July.

== Records ==
Records before the 2023 Asian Athletics Championships
Record	Athlete (nation)	Time (s)	Location	Date
World record	Jarmila Kratochvílová (TCH)	1:53.28	Munich, West Germany	26 July 1983
Asian record	Liu Dong (CHN)	1:55.54	Beijing, China	9 September 1993
Championship record	Zhang Jian (CHN)	2:01.16	Fukuoka, Japan	21 July 1998
World leading	Keely Hodgkinson (GBR)	1:55.77	Paris, France	9 June 2023
Asian leading	Tharushi Karunarathna (SRI)	2:01.39	Colombo, Sri Lanka	20 March 2023

== Results ==
=== Heats ===
Qualification rule: First 3 in each heat (Q) and the next 2 fastest (q) qualified for the final.

Rank	Heat	Name	Nationality	Time	Notes
1	1	K.M. Chanda	India	2:04.55	Q
2	1	Ayano Shiomi	Japan	2:05.70	Q
3	1	Gayanthika Abeyratne	Sri Lanka	2:06.01	Q
4	2	Tharushi Karunarathna	Sri Lanka	2:07.16	Q
5	2	Wu Hongjiao	China	2:07.64	Q
6	2	Airi Ikezaki	Japan	2:07.95	Q
7	2	Lavika Sharma	India	2:09.06	q
8	2	Nguyễn Thị Thu Hà	Vietnam	2:09.31	q
9	1	Savinder Kaur Joginder Singh	Malaysia	2:09.59	
10	1	Chui Ling Goh	Singapore	2:09.81	
11	2	Bernalyn Bejoy	Philippines	2:10.22	
12	2	Angela Freitas De Araujo	Timor-Leste	2:15.71	
13	1	Ruedee Netthai	Thailand	2:21.08	PB
14	1	Phulmati Rana	Nepal	2:22.12	
15	1	Haneen Yaqoub	Palestine	2:27.46	NR
16	2	Fasuha Ahmed	Maldives	2:28.94	

=== Final ===
Rank	Name	Nationality	Time	Notes
1st place, gold medalist(s)	Tharushi Karunarathna	Sri Lanka	2:00.66	NR
2nd place, silver medalist(s)	K.M. Chanda	India	2:01.58	=PB
3rd place, bronze medalist(s)	Gayanthika Abeyratne	Sri Lanka	2:03.25	
4	Airi Ikezaki	Japan	2:04.21	
5	Ayano Shiomi	Japan	2:04.25	
6	Nguyễn Thị Thu Hà	Vietnam	2:10.14	
7	Wu Hongjiao	China	2:10.78	
	Lavika Sharma	India	DNF	
