= Comoros at the 2021 Summer World University Games =

- Flag of the Comoros
- IOC code: COM

in Chengdu, China 28 July 2023 – 8 August 2023
- Competitors: 2 (1 man and 1 woman)
- Medals: Gold 0 Silver 0 Bronze 0 Total 0

Summer World University Games appearances
- 1959; 1961; 1963; 1965; 1967; 1970; 1973; 1975; 1977; 1979; 1981; 1983; 1985; 1987; 1989; 1991; 1993; 1995; 1997; 1999; 2001; 2003; 2005; 2007; 2009; 2011; 2013; 2015; 2017; 2019; 2021; 2025; 2027

Comoros competed at the 2021 Summer World University Games in Chengdu, China held from 28 July to 8 August 2023.

== Competitors ==
Sport	Men	Women	Total
Athletics	0	1	1
Swimming	1	0	1

== Athletics ==
Women

Athlete	Event	Heat		Semi-finals		Final	
Athlete	Event	Result	Rank	Result	Rank	Result	Rank
Soudi-Thasmy Moussa	400 metre	1:10.16	27	Did not advance			
Soudi-Thasmy Moussa	800 metres	2:54.72	15	—		Did not advance	

== Swimming ==
Men

Athlete	Event	Heat		Semi-finals		Final	
Athlete	Event	Time	Rank	Time	Rank	Time	Rank
Youssouf Hadji Bacar	50 metre freestyle	29.89	53	Did not advance			
Youssouf Hadji Bacar	50 metre breaststroke	38.09	48	Did not advance			
