= Basketball at the 2025 Summer World University Games =

Basketball at the Universiade
- Venues: Various
- Dates: 18–26 July 2025
- Teams: 16 (men); 16 (women)

Basketball was contested at the 2025 Summer World University Games from 18 to 26 July 2025 at Duisburg, Essen, and Hagen, Germany.

== Venue ==
Venue	City
Walter-Schädlich-Halle	Duisburg
Grugahalle	Essen
Sporthalle am Hallo	Essen
Ischelandhalle	Hagen

== Draw ==
The draw was held in April 2025 at the Airship Hangar Mülheim.

=== Men's competition ===
Pool A	Pool B	Pool C	Pool D
Germany	United States	Czech Republic	Argentina
Finland	Romania	Brazil	Lithuania
Chinese Taipei	Latvia	Poland	Lebanon
Chile	India	Philippines	South Korea

=== Women's competition ===
Pool A	Pool B	Pool C	Pool D
Finland	Germany	Japan	China
Czech Republic	Poland	Hungary	Portugal
Argentina	Chinese Taipei	Brazil	Romania
India	United States	Lithuania	Chile

== Medal table ==
* Host nation (Germany)

Rank	Nation	Gold	Silver	Bronze	Total
1	Germany*	2	0	0	2
2	China	1	1	0	2
2	Spain	1	1	0	2
4	Lithuania	1	0	1	2
5	Brazil	1	0	0	1
6	United States	0	3	3	6
7	Great Britain	0	1	0	1
8	Czech Republic	0	0	1	1
8	Hungary	0	0	1	1
Totals (9 entries)		6	6	6	18

== Medal summary ==
=== Medal events ===
Event	Gold	Silver	Bronze
Men	Brazil; Adyel Borges; Gabriel Campos; Paulo Henrique Barbosa; Anderson Santana; Yuri Neptune; Reynan Santos; Matheus Silva; Bruno Cardoso; Leonardo Colimerio; Agapy Santos; Rafael Silva; Gabriel Souza	United States; Daniel Skillings; Jaylon White; Will Kuykendall; Drew Perry; Obi Agbim; Andre Iguodala II; Isaac Williams IV; Samson Aletan; Cameron Carr; Caden Powell	Lithuania; Gediminas Leščiauskas; Dominykas Stenionis; Modestas Kancleris; Jonas Sirtautas; Kristupas Keinys; Matas Repšys; Mintautas Mockus; Matas Macijauskas; Nojus Kulieša; Martynas Sabaliauskas; Armandas Plintauskas; Gytis Nemeikša
Women	China; Li Qingyang; Tian Yuanyuan; Zhao Ruohan; Zhang Zihan; Li Xingnuo; Zhang Shuxuan; Tang Ziting; Chen Yujie; Cao Boyi; Liu Yutong; Na Han	United States; Jalynn Bristow; Kenadee Winfrey; Laci White; Denae Fritz; Kalysta Martin; Clara Blacklock; Sidney Love; Bailey Maupin; Jada Malone; Deyona Gaston	Hungary; Zsuzsanna Sitku; Sára Laczkó; Barbara Angyal; Terka Zsófia Dúl; Eszter Varga; Réka Dombai; Dorina Takács; Panka Dulcinea Dúl; Lili Krasovec; Janka Gyöngyösi; Zsófia Réka Telegdy; Franka Emilia Tóth
Men's 3x3	Lithuania; Rokas Jocys; Augustinas Mikštas; Titas Januševičius; Gabrielius Čelka	United States; Avery Brown; Jackson Hicke; Chandler Pigge; Nicholas Townsend	Czech Republic; Matěj Rychtecký; Adam Růžička; Štěpán Borovka; Dominik Žák
Women's 3x3	Germany; Laura Zolper; Elisa Mevius; Luisa Nufer; Sarah Polleros	China; Wang Xiaoqing; Liu Bei; Zhang Tao; Gao Ziyue	United States; Jaclyn Grisdale; Cecelia Collins; Talya Brugler; Lee Volker
Men's wheelchair 3x3	Spain; Alejandro García; Pablo Lavandeira; Ignacio Ortega; Adrián García	Great Britain; James Hazell; Alexander Marshall-Wilson; Shayne Humphries; William Bishop	United States; Jack Pierre; Joseph Rafter; Ryan Fitzpatrick; Martrell Stevens
Women's wheelchair 3x3	Germany; Lilly Sellak; Svenja Erni; Catharina Weiß; Lisa Bergenthal	Spain; Beatriz Zudaire; Sara Revuelta; Sindy Ramos; Naiara Rodríguez	United States; Anesia Glascoe; Hannah Exline; Marlee Wagstaff; Elizabeth Becker
