= Athletics at the 2021 Summer World University Games – Women's 4 × 400 metres relay =

The women's 4 × 400 metres relay event at the 2021 Summer World University Games was held on 5 and 6 August 2023 at the Shuangliu Sports Centre Stadium in Chengdu, China.

== Medalists ==
Gold	Silver	Bronze
Poland; Weronika Bartnowska; Karolina Łozowska; Margarita Koczanowa; Aleksandra Formella; Natalia Wosztyl; Marlena Granaszewska	Brazil; Marlene Santos; Letícia Lima; Giovana dos Santos; Anny de Bassi	Switzerland; Noémie Salamin; Veronica Vancardo; Oksana Aeschbacher; Karin Disch

== Results ==
=== Round 1 ===
Qualification: First 3 in each heat (Q) and the next 2 fastest (q) advance to final.

Rank	Heat	Nation	Athletes	Time	Notes
1	1	Poland	Weronika Bartnowska, Margarita Koczanowa, Natalia Wosztyl, Marlena Granaszewska	3:34.52	Q
2	1	South Africa	Angelique Strydom, Rogail Joseph, Ngoanamashiane Molepo, Marlie Viljoen	3:37.34	Q
3	1	Brazil	Marlene Santos, Letícia Lima, Giovana dos Santos, Anny de Bassi	3:37.76	Q
4	2	Algeria	Djamila Zine, Roukia Mouici, Douaa Ferdi, Chaima Ouanis	3:39.18	Q
5	2	China	Wang Hongyan, Fu Yijia, Jiang Yiran, Yang Hongfei	3:40.08	Q
6	1	Switzerland	Noémie Salamin, Veronica Vancardo, Karin Disch, Oksana Aeschbacher	3:43.55	q
7	2	Malaysia	Mandy Goh Li, Zaimah Zainuddin, Teoh Kim Chyi, Chelsea Bopulas	3:44.55	Q
8	2	India	Nidhi Singh, Neha, Dhivya Jayaram, Rashdeep Kaur	3:45.26	q
9	1	Uganda	Dorothy Abeja, Marvarious Orishaba, Jacent Nyamahunge, Grace Ayozu	3:52.42	
–	2	Botswana		DNS	

=== Final ===
Rank	Nation	Athletes	Time	Notes
1st place, gold medalist(s)	Poland	Weronika Bartnowska, Karolina Łozowska, Margarita Koczanowa, Aleksandra Formella	3:32.81	
2nd place, silver medalist(s)	Brazil	Marlene Santos, Letícia Lima, Giovana dos Santos, Anny de Bassi	3:34.31	
3rd place, bronze medalist(s)	Switzerland	Noémie Salamin, Veronica Vancardo, Oksana Aeschbacher, Karin Disch	3:34.57	
4	South Africa	Rogail Joseph, Angelique Strydom, Gezelle Magerman, Marlie Viljoen	3:35.47	
5	China	Wang Hongyan, Fu Yijia, Jiang Yiran, Yang Hongfei	3:41.07	
6	Malaysia	Mandy Goh Li, Zaimah Zainuddin, Teoh Kim Chyi, Chelsea Bopulas	3:46.33	
–	Algeria	Djamila Zine, Roukia Mouici, Douaa Ferdi, Chaima Ouanis	DQ	TR24.7
–	India	Nidhi Singh, Dhivya Jayaram, Simran Kaur, Rashdeep Kaur	DQ	TR17.4.3
