= Smilla Kolbe =

German middle-distance runner (born 2002)

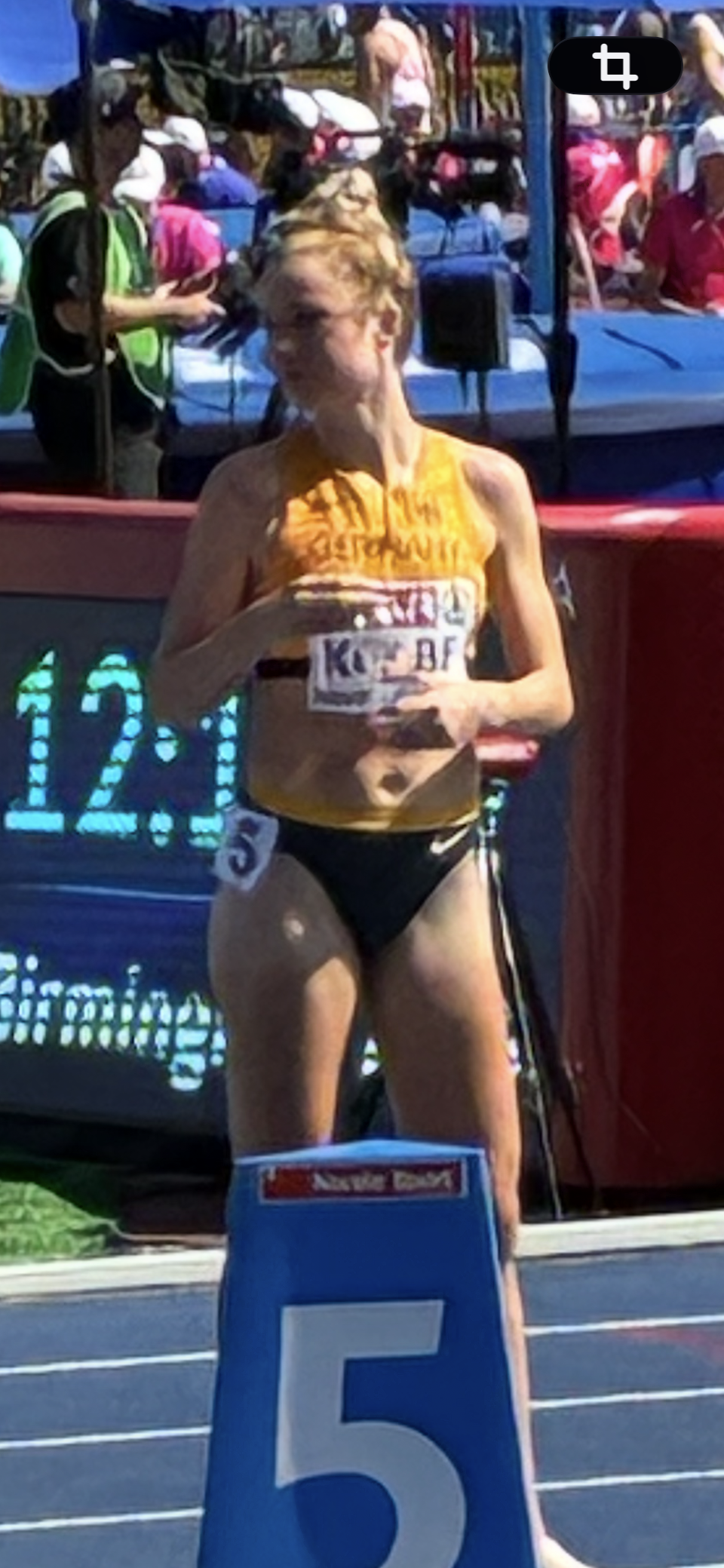

Personal information
- Nationality: German
- Born: 1 March 2002 (age 24)

Sport
- Country: Germany
- Sport: Athletics
- Event: Middle-distance running

Achievements and titles
- Personal bests: 800 m: 1:57.80 (Birmingham, 2026); 1500 m: 4:13.77 (Atlanta, 2025)

Smilla Kolbe (born 1 March 2002) is a German middle-distance runner who has won the German national championships title in the 800 metres.

== Biography ==
From Brelingen, Hanover, in Germany, she is a member of Eintracht Frankfurt. She studied psychology with a minor in criminal justice in the United States at the University of North Florida.

Competing for the University of North Florida, she was a semi-finalist at the 2024 NCAA Division I Outdoor Track and Field Championships over 800 metres in Eugene, Oregon.

She reached the finals of the 800 metres at the NCAA Championships both indoors and outdoors in 2025, placing fifth indoors in Virginia Beach in March 2025 and sixth outdoors in Eugene, Oregon in June, in 2:00.37. In March, she was named the Atlantic Sun Conference (ASUN) Women's Indoor Track and Field Scholar-Athlete of the Year. During the outdoor season she improved her 800 metres personal best to 1:59.02 in May 2025, whilst competing in Jacksonville, Florida.

She made her international debut representing Germany over 800 metres at the 2025 European Athletics Team Championships First Division in Madrid, Spain, running 2:00.90 on 28 June. The following month, she reached the final of the 800 metres at the 2025 World Summer University Games in Bochum, placing fifth overall.

She finished ahead of Majtie Kolberg to win over 800 metres at the German Athletics Championships in Dresden in August 2025. She competed in the women's 800 metres at the 2025 World Athletics Championships in Tokyo, Japan.

Kolbe placed second in the 800 metres at the German Indoor Athletics Championships in Dortmund. On 17 June, she ran a personal best 1:58.99 to win over 800 metres at the Meeting de Montreuil ahead of Agathe Guillemot. Shortly after, she defended her national title over the 800 m with a winning time of 2:02,20 min. ahead of Jana Becker. Subsequently, she represented Germany at the 2026 European Athletics Championships in Birmingham (England), running a personal best of 1:57.80. and reaching the semifinal.
