= Malaysia at the 2025 Summer World University Games =

- Flag of Malaysia
- IOC code: MAS
- National federation: Malaysian University Sports Council
- Website: www.masum.org.my

in Rhine-Ruhr, Germany 16 July 2025 – 27 July 2025
- Competitors: 64 (39 men and 25 women) in 6 sports
- Flag bearer: Muhammad Azeem Mohd Fahmi
- Medals Ranked 47th: Gold 0 Silver 1 Bronze 1 Total 2

Summer World University Games appearances (overview)
- 1985; 1987; 1989; 1991; 1993; 1995; 1997; 1999; 2001; 2003; 2005; 2007; 2009; 2011; 2013; 2015; 2017; 2019; 2021; 2025; 2027

Malaysia will compete at the 2025 Summer World University Games, which will held from 16 July to 27 July 2025 in Rhine-Ruhr region, Germany.

== Competitors ==
The following is the list of competitors in the Games.

Sport	Men	Women	Total
Archery	6	6	12
Athletics	13	10	23
Badminton	6	6	12
Gymnastics	1	0	1
Swimming	6	0	6
Taekwondo	7	1	8
Total	39	25	64

== Medal summary ==
=== Medal by sports ===
Medals by sport
Sport	1st place, gold medalist(s)	2nd place, silver medalist(s)	3rd place, bronze medalist(s)	Total
Swimming	0	1	0	1
Badminton	0	0	1	1
Total	0	1	1	2

=== Medal by date ===
Medals by date
Day	Date	1st place, gold medalist(s)	2nd place, silver medalist(s)	3rd place, bronze medalist(s)	Total
1	16 July	Opening Ceremony			
2	17 July	0	1	0	1
3	18 July	0	0	0	0
4	19 July	0	0	0	0
5	20 July	0	0	0	0
6	21 July	0	0	0	0
7	22 July	0	0	0	0
8	23 July	0	0	0	0
9	24 July	0	0	0	0
10	25 July	0	0	1	1
11	26 July	0	0	0	0
12	27 July	0	0	0	0
Total		0	1	1	2

=== Medalists ===
Medal	Name	Sport	Event	Date
Silver	Khiew Hoe Yean	Swimming	Men's 400 m freestyle	July 17
Bronze	Wong Ling Ching	Badminton	Women's singles	July 25

== Archery ==
Athlete	Event	Ranking round		Round of 48	Round of 24	Round of 16	Round of 8	Quarterfinals	Semifinals	Final / BM	
Athlete	Event	Score	Seed	Opposition Score	Opposition Score	Opposition Score	Opposition Score	Opposition Score	Opposition Score	Opposition Score	Rank
Mohamad Firdaus Rusmadi	Men's recurve	621	49	Martin Mihevc (SLO); W 6–0	Jarno De Smedt (BEL); L 3–7	Did not advance					
Akid Bazli Ezaidin	Men's recurve	631	38	Lukas Jacobsson (SWE); W 7–3	Keziah Chabin (SUI); L 2–6	Did not advance					
Muhammad Haziq Khalil	Men's recurve	614	56	Alessio Mangerini (ITA); W 7–3	Feng Hao (CHN); L 2–6	Did not advance					
Nur Azimi Norwafi	Men's compound	690	24	Bye	Jonathan Grafe (GER); L 139–140	Did not advance					
Mohamad Syafiq Ariffin	Men's compound	688	29	Bye	Li Jinpeng (CHN); W 145–141	Ajay Scott (GBR); L 144–145	Did not advance				
Nabil Thaqif Saharuddin	Men's compound	679	39	Bye	Yakup Yıldız (TUR); L 138–147	Did not advance					
Syaqiera Mashayikh	Women's recurve	642	20	Bye	Ilona Hollander (NED); W 6–0	Basanti Mahato (IND); L 4–6	Did not advance				
Ariana Nur Dania Zairi	Women's recurve	642	18	Bye	Lucja Wesolowska (POL); W 6–2	Lee Ga-hyun (KOR); L 2–6	Did not advance				
Alia Qursyiah Mazlan	Women's recurve	615	40	Maxine Pichonnaz (SUI); W 6–4	Gizem Ozkan (TUR); L 5–6	Did not advance					
Nisa Aliya Radzif	Women's compound	644	41	—N/a	Martina Zikmundova (CZE); L 137–144	Did not advance					
Natasha Shahruddin	Women's compound	668	28	—N/a	Jyotsna Challa (CAN); W 140–138	Kim Soo-yeon (KOR); L 138–147	Did not advance				
Syaza Husna Mahari	Women's compound	653	34	—N/a	Viktoriia Kardash (UKR); W 143–135	Park Ye-rin (KOR); L 143–144	Did not advance				

Team

Athlete	Event	Round of 12	Round of 8	Quarterfinals	Semifinals	Final / BM	
Athlete	Event	Opposition Score	Opposition Score	Opposition Score	Opposition Score	Opposition Score	Rank
Akid Bazli Ezaidin; Mohamad Firdaus Rusmadi; Muhammad Haziq Khalil	Men's recurve	—N/a	Japan; L 0–6	Did not advance			
Mohamad Syafiq Ariffin; Nur Azimi Norwafi; Nabil Thaqif Saharuddin	Men's compound	—N/a	Ukraine; W 234–229	South Korea; L 233–238	Did not advance		
Syaqiera Mashayikh; Ariana Nur Dania Zairi; Alia Qursyiah Mazlan	Women's recurve	—N/a	Slovakia; W 5–1	South Korea; W 5–1	Japan; L 2–6	China; L 1–5	4
Nisa Aliya Radzif; Syaza Husna Mahari; Natasha Mohd Shahruddin	Women's compound	—N/a	Croatia; L 204–213	Did not advance			
Akid Bazli Ezaidin; Muhammad Haziq Khalil; Mohamad Firdaus Rusmadi; Syaqiera Mashayikh; Ariana Nur Dania Zairi; Alia Qursyiah Mazlan	Mixed recurve	Belgium; W 6–0	Chinese Taipei; L 3–5	Did not advance			
Mohamad Syafiq Ariffin; Nur Azimi Norwafi; Nabil Thaqif Saharuddin; Nisa Aliya Radzif; Syaza Husna Mahari; Natasha Mohd Shahruddin	Mixed compound	Slovenia; L 146–149	Did not advance				

== Athletics ==
=== Track & road events ===
Men

Athlete	Event	Heat		Semifinal		Final	
Athlete	Event	Time	Rank	Time	Rank	Time	Rank
Aliff Iman Fahimi	100 m	11.09	5	Did not advance			
Muhd Azeem Fahmi	100 m	10.57	1 Q	10.43	3 q	10.35	4
Pengiran Aidil Hajam	200 m	21.69	5	Did not advance			
Muhd Azeem Fahmi	200 m	21.26	4 q	21.51	7	Did not advance	
Aidil Azhar Azrul Hisyam	400 m	—N/a		Did not advance			
Umar Osman	400 m	46.97	4 q	47.10	6	Did not advance	
Wan Muhammad Fazri Wan Zahari	800 m	1:49.53	5 q	1:49.87	6	Did not advance	
Fakrul Afizul Nasir	400 m hurdles	1:11.87	8	Did not advance			
Aliff Iman Fahimi; Thaqif Hisham; Pengiran Aidil Hajam; Muhd Azeem Fahmi	4x100 m relay	39.83 SB	3 Q	—N/a		40.19	8

Women

Athlete	Event	Heat		Semifinal		Final	
Athlete	Event	Time	Rank	Time	Rank	Time	Rank
Nur Afrina Batrisyia	100 m	12.32	5	Did not advance			
Azreen Nabila Alias	100 m	12.04	6	Did not advance			
Chelsea Evali Bopulas	400 m	56.36	6	Did not advance			
Hizillawanty Jamain	800 m	2:18.45	8	Did not advance			
Mandy Goh Li	400 m hurdles	1:03.12	5	Did not advance			
Azreen Nabila Alias; Aliah Maisarah Azmi; Nur Afrina Batrisyia; Chelsea Evali Bopulas	4x100 m relay	46.86 SB	6	Did not advance			
Chelsea Evali Bopulas; Mandy Goh Li; Hizillawanty Jamain; Aliah Maisarah Azmi	4x400 m relay	3:55.21	4 q	—N/a		3:54.88 SB	7

Mixed

Athlete	Event	Heat		Semifinal		Final	
Athlete	Event	Time	Rank	Time	Rank	Time	Rank
Umar Osman; Aidil Azhar Azrul Hisyam; Chelsea Evali Bopulas; Aliah Maisarah Azmi	4x400 m relay	3:31.72	7	Did not advance			

=== Field events ===
Men

Athlete	Event	Qualification		Final	
Athlete	Event	Distance	Position	Distance	Position
Farrell Glenn Felix Jurus	High jump	2.08	6	Did not advance	
Izzul Haniff Raffi	Triple jump	15.43	12	Did not advance	
Naufal Shahrul Afzam	Pole vault	5.05	11	Did not advance	
Jonah Chang Rigan	Shot put	17.75	8	Did not advance	

Women

Athlete	Event	Qualification		Final	
Athlete	Event	Distance	Position	Distance	Position
Nurul Ashikin Abas	Triple jump	12.98 SB	7 q	12.70	12
Grace Wong Xiu Mei	Hammer throw	59.64	11	Did not advance	
Ng Jing Xuan	Javelin throw	47.97	8	Did not advance	
Nani Sahirah Maryata	Shot put	14.57	11	Did not advance	

== Badminton ==
Singles

Athlete	Event	Round of 128	Round of 64	Round of 32	Round of 16	Quarter-final	Semi-final	Final	
Athlete	Event	Opposition Score	Opposition Score	Opposition Score	Opposition Score	Opposition Score	Opposition Score	Opposition Score	Rank
Eogene Ewe	Men's singles	Bye	Richen Dorji (BHU); W (15–4, 15–4)	Donnians Oliveira (BRA); W (15–8, 15–9)	Wongsup Wongsup-in (THA); W (15–12, 15–9)	Ting Yen-chen (TPE); L (13–15, 14–16)	Did not advance		
Kok Jing Hong	Men's singles	Bye	Melcom Lim (SGP); W (15–9, 15–7)	Sok Rikreay (CAM); W (15–6, 15–6)	Wang Zijun (CHN); L (10–15, 15–17)	Did not advance			
Wong Ling Ching	Women's singles	Bye	Sydney Go (AUS); W (15–6, 15–7)	Weronika Gorniak (POL); W (15–6, 15–8)	Siti Zulaikha (MAS); W (15–3, 15–12)	Devika Sihag (IND); W (17–15, 15–11)	Tidapron Kleebyeesun (THA); L (16–14, 5–15, 13–15)	Did not advance	3rd place, bronze medalist(s)
Siti Zulaikha	Women's singles	Bye	Matale Mukuka (ZAM); W (15–2, 15–2)	Suhasni Vidanage (SRI); W (15–10, 15–9)	Wong Ling Ching (MAS); L (3–15, 12–15)	Did not advance			

Doubles

Athlete	Event	Round of 64	Round of 32	Round of 16	Quarter-final	Semi-final	Final	
Athlete	Event	Opposition Score	Opposition Score	Opposition Score	Opposition Score	Opposition Score	Opposition Score	Rank
Bryan Goonting / Fazriq Razif	Men's doubles	Bye	Shiina Sato / Tsubasa Yoshida (JPN); L (9–15, 7–15)	Did not advance				
Liew Xun / Wee Yee Hern	Men's doubles	Shiina Sato / Tsubasa Yoshida (JPN); L (12–15, 10–15)	Did not advance					
Lee Xin Jie / Low Yeen Yuan	Women's doubles	Sharifah Danial / Joanna Wu (SGP); W (15–4, 15–5)	Jheng Yu-chieh / Sung Yu-hsuan (TPE); L (15–11, 6–15, 8–15)	Did not advance				
Vannee Gobi / Clarissa San	Women's doubles	Sumire Nakade / Yumi Tanabe (JPN); L (11–15, 17–19)	Did not advance					
Liew Xun / Vannee Gobi	Mixed doubles	Bene Benjámin Kiss / Hella Szűcs (HUN); W (15–5, 15–4)	Sathish Karunakaran / Vaishnavi Khadkekar (IND); W (15–9, 3–1^{r})	Jin Yong / Lee Hye-won (KOR); L (8–15, 17–15, 8–15)	Did not advance			
Wee Yee Hern / Clarissa San	Mixed doubles	Tsubasa Yoshida / Sumire Nakade (JPN); L (10–15, 15–8, 11–15)	Did not advance					

Team

Team	Event	Group matches		Round of 16	Quarter-final	Semi-final	Final	
Team	Event	Opposition Score	Rank	Opposition Score	Opposition Score	Opposition Score	Opposition Score	Rank
Eogene Ewe; Bryan Goonting; Liew Xun; Kok Jing Hong; Fazriq Razif; Wee Yee Hern; Vannee Gobi; Siti Zulaikha; Clarissa San; Wong Ling Ching; Lee Xin Jie; Low Yeen Yuan	Mixed team	Canada; W 4–1	1 Q	France; W 3–0	India; L 2–3	Did not advance		

== Gymnastics ==
Individual finals

Gymnast	Event	Qualification		Final	
Gymnast	Event	Score	Rank	Score	Rank
Ng Chun Chen	Pommel horse	10.133	89	Did not advance	
Ng Chun Chen	Parallel bars	11.733	65	Did not advance	
Ng Chun Chen	Vault	13.416	11	Did not advance	

== Swimming ==
Athlete	Event	Heat		Semifinal		Final	
Athlete	Event	Time	Rank	Time	Rank	Time	Rank
Khiew Hoe Yean	Men's 200 m freestyle	1:48.68	7 Q	1:48.91	13	Did not advance	
Khiew Hoe Yean	Men's 400 m freestyle	3:50.13	4 Q	—N/a		3:47.38 NR	2nd place, silver medalist(s)
Khiew Hoe Yean	Men's 200 m backstroke	2:03.20	22	Did not advance			
Bryan Leong	Men's 50 m freestyle	23.19	35	Did not advance			
Bryan Leong	Men's 50 m butterfly	24.51	32	Did not advance			
Bryan Leong	Men's 100 m butterfly	54.54	34	Did not advance			
Andrew Goh	Men's 50 m breaststroke	27.85	11	27.90	11	Did not advance	
Andrew Goh	Men's 100 m breaststroke	1:02.63	29	Did not advance			
Andrew Goh	Men's 200 m breaststroke	2:17.84	24	Did not advance			
Lim Yin Chuen	Men's 50 m freestyle	23.53	42	Did not advance			
Lim Yin Chuen	Men's 100 m freestyle	50.28	32	Did not advance			
Tan Khai Xin	Men's 200 m individual medley	2:07.11	33	Did not advance			
Tan Khai Xin	Men's 400 m individual medley	4:33.78	19	Did not advance			
Arvin Chahal	Men's 100 m freestyle	50.05	28	Did not advance			
Arvin Chahal	Men's 200 m freestyle	1:49.66	15 Q	1:49.64	16	Did not advance	
Khiew Hoe Yean; Bryan Leong; Arvin Chahal; Lim Yin Chuen	Men's 4x100 m freestyle relay	3:23.47	13	Did not advance			
Khiew Hoe Yean; Tan Khai Xin; Arvin Chahal; Lim Yin Chuen	Men's 4x200 m freestyle relay	7:19.81	5 Q	—N/a		7:19.66	6
Khiew Hoe Yean; Bryan Leong; Andrew Goh; Lim Yin Chuen	Men's 4x100 m medley relay	3:42.47	14	Did not advance			

== Taekwondo ==
Poomsae

Athlete	Event	Round of 32	Round of 16	Final	
Athlete	Event	Opposition Result	Opposition Result	Score	Rank
Ken Haw Chin	Men's individual Poomsae	Eric Gitonga (KEN); W WWD	Eric Gun (USA); L 8.649–8.799	Did not advance	
Yow Mei Yee	Women's individual Poomsae	Tuva Hatlen (NOR); W 8.749–8.465	Jung Haeun (KOR); L 8.866–8.932	Did not advance	
Ken Haw Chin; Yow Mei Yee	Mixed team Poomsae	Bye	Han Dahyun / Kang Minjae (KOR); L 8.899–8.966	Did not advance	
Ken Haw Chin; Jason Loo; Randy Owen	Men's team Poomsae	Bye	Italy; W 8.766–8.332	8.449	6

Kyorugi

Athlete	Event	Round of 32	Round of 16	Quarterfinals	Semifinals	Final	
Athlete	Event	Opposition Result	Opposition Result	Opposition Result	Opposition Result	Opposition Result	Rank
Fu Cern Put Thai	Men's −58 kg	Enes Kaplan (TUR); L 0–2	Did not advance				
Iman Hakim Rakib	Men's −68 kg	Hsu Hao-yu (TPE); L 0–2	Did not advance				
Syafiq Zuber	Men's −87 kg	Mohammed Alsowaiq (KSA); W 2–0	Erol Nuci (BIH); W 2–0	Michael Rodriguez (USA); L 0–2	Did not advance		
Luqman Haqim Suhaimi	Men's +87 kg	Eric Gitonga (KEN); W 2–0	Marat Mavlonov (UZB); L 0–2	Did not advance			
Fu Cern Put Thai; Iman Hakim Rakib; Syafiq Zuber	Men's team	—N/a	Chinese Taipei; L 0–2	Did not advance			
