= Margarita Koczanowa =

Polish athlete (born 1999)

Personal information
- Nationality: Polish
- Born: 1 February 1999 (age 27) Grodno, Belarus

Sport
- Sport: Athletics
- Event: Middle-distance running

Achievements and titles
- Personal bests: 800m: 1:59.37 (Tokyo, 2025)
Medal record
Women's athletics
Representing Poland
Summer World University Games
Gold medal – first place	2021 Chengdu	4x400m relay

Margarita Koczanowa (born 1 February 1999) is a Polish middle-distance runner. In 2023, she became Polish national indoor 800 metres champion at the Polish Indoor Athletics Championships.

== Early and personal life ==
Born in Grodno to a Russian father, her mother's parents are Polish and she spoke the Polish language at home. She obtained a Polish passport in the spring of 2021 and had to forego her Belarusian citizenship. She had left Belarus for Poland to study in Łódź in 2017 before later living with her sister in Kraków.

== Career ==
In 2018, she represented Belarus in the 2018 World Athletics U20 Championships in Tampere, Finland and at that time trained with Henryka Blausz. She was later trained by Zbigniew Król and became a member of AZS AWF Kraków. She was selected to represent Poland at the 2021 European Athletics U23 Championships in Tallinn, but while she awaiting the start of the competition in Estonia she was informed that there had been an issue with her paperwork around her nationality change to Poland and was not able to compete.

In February 2023, she became Polish 800 metres champion at the Polish Indoor Athletics Championships in Toruń. That year, Koczanowa made her senior debut in Polish colours, racing at the 2023 European Athletics Indoor Championships in Istanbul, Turkey and the 2023 World Athletics Championships in Budapest, Hungary. She won gold in the 4 x 400 metres relay at the 2021 Summer World University Games held in China in 2023, where she also reached the final of the individual 800 metres.

From January 2024, she began to be trained by Andrzej Giza, and from March 2025, she began to run under the direction of Aneta Lemiesz. In May 2025, she improved her personal best for the 800 metres to 2:00.87 whilst competing at the Janusz Kusociński Memorial in Chorzów. She then ran at the 2025 Meeting International Mohammed VI d'Athlétisme de Rabat, part of the 2025 Diamond League. Later that month, she ran a new 800 metres personal best of 1:59.94 at the World Athletics Continental Tour Gold meeting in Bydgoszcz.

She set a new personal best at the 2025 Kamila Skolimowska Memorial, in Poland, with a run of 1:59.90 for the 800 metres. She competed in the women's 800 metres at the 2025 World Athletics Championships in Tokyo, Japan, running another personal best of 1:59.37, without advancing to the semi-finals.
