= Lisa Bergenthal =

German wheelchair basketball player

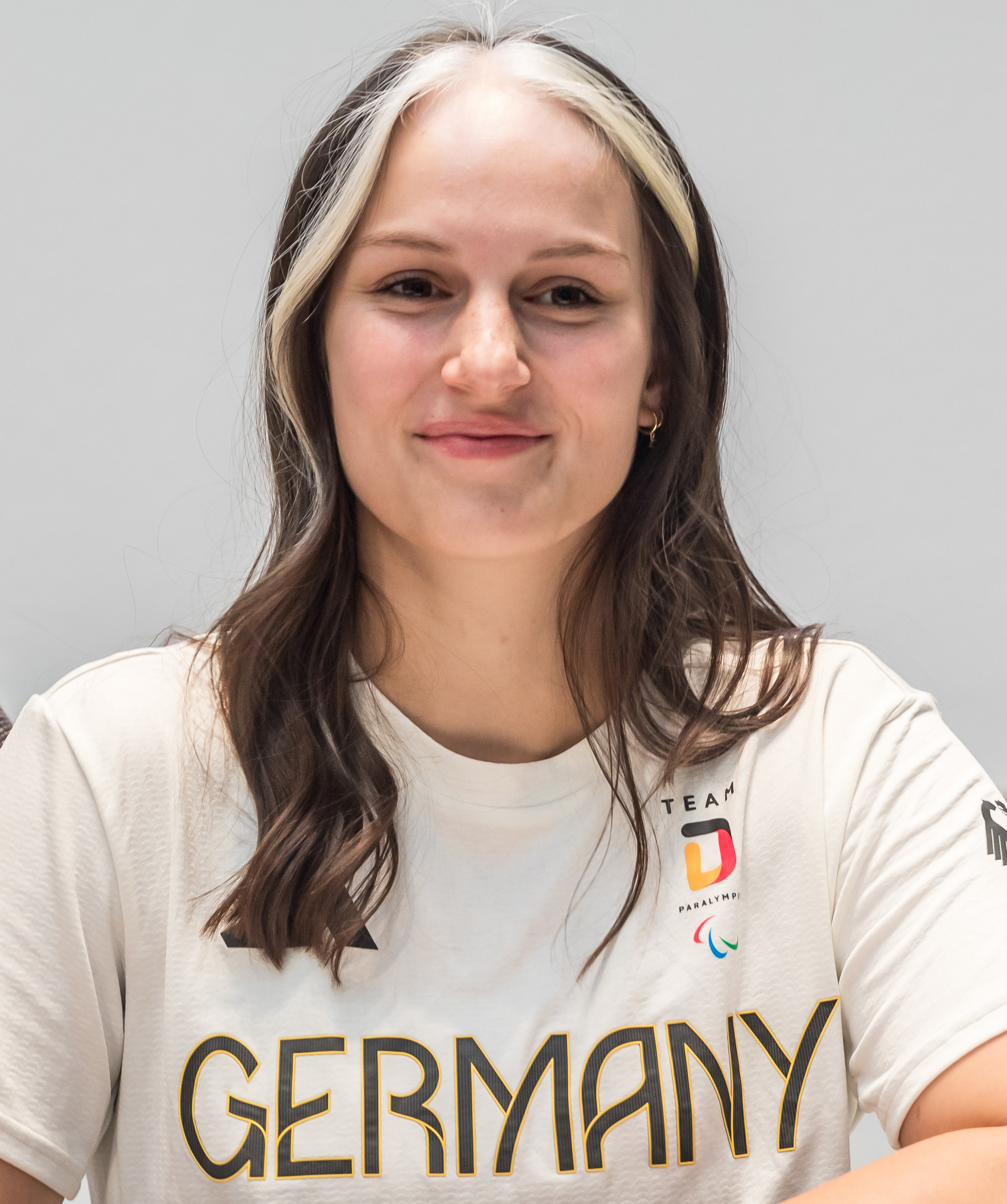
- Bergenthal in 2024

Personal information
- Nationality: German
- Born: 30 November 1999 (age 26) Mechernich, Germany
- Height: 1.60 m (5 ft 3 in)

Sport
- Sport: Wheelchair basketball
- Disability class: 3,5
- Club: RBC Köln 99ers
Medal record
Representing Germany
Summer Universiade
Gold medal – first place	2025 Rhine-Ruhr	Wheelchair 3x3

Lisa Bergenthal (born 30 November 1999) is a German wheelchair basketball player who competes at international basketball competitions. She is a Universiade champion and has competed at the 2020 and 2024 Summer Paralympics.

Bergenthal is studying education science at University of Cologne.
