= K. M. Chanda =

Indian middle-distance runner

Personal information
- Nationality: Indian
- Born: 16 August 2001 (age 24) North Delhi, India

Sport
- Country: India
- Sport: Athletics
- Event: Middle-distance running
Medal record
Women's athletics
Representing India
Asian Championships
| Silver medal – second place | 2023 Bangkok | 800 m |
- Updated on June 2023

Kumari Chanda (16 August 2001) is an Indian middle-distance runner. She won a silver medal at the 2023 Asian Athletics Championships women's 800 metres.

== Career ==
In 2019, Chanda set a national record in the 1,500m race (4:17.19) and won gold in the 3000m event at the 35th Junior National Athletics Championship held in Andhra Pradesh. She won the gold medal in the 800m race at the National School Athletics Competition in Punjab in December 2019 by finishing the 800 meters in 2 minutes and 9 seconds. At the 2021 Federation Cup Senior Athletics Championships, which were held in Delhi in March, Chanda won a gold medal. In the 2022 Federation Cup held at Kozhikode, she won the 800 meters race and finished third in 1500 meters. The same year, she won the gold medal in the 800m and 1500m race at the 36th National Games held in Gujarat. By finishing the 800 meters at a time of 2:01.58, she set a new national record. With a time of 2.01.58, Chanda won the silver medal for 800 meters at the 2023 Asian Athletics Championships, held in Bangkok.

== Personal life ==
Chanda hails from Alipur village in North Delhi.
