= Lucy Armitage =

British middle-distance runner (born 2004)

Personal information
- Born: 3 August 2004 (age 22)

Sport
- Sport: Athletics
- Events: Middle-distance running, Cross country running
- Club: Sale Harriers

Achievements and titles
- Personal bests: 800m: 1:59.97 (2026); 1500m: 4:19.25 (2025); Road; 5km: 16:27 (2025); 10km: 34:53 (2025)

Lucy Armitage (born 3 August 2004) is a British middle-distance and cross country runner. She placed third over 800 metres at the 2026 UK Athletics Championships.

== Biography ==
A member of Sale Harriers Manchester, Armitage has a top-five placing representing England in the junior women’s race at the Cross Italica in Seville, Spain, in November 2023.

Armitage was runner-up to Jessica Lark over 800 metres at the BMC Grand prix in Birmingham in 2:03.10, in June 2025. She was named in the British team for the 2025 Summer World University Games in Germany, where she was a semi-finalist in the women's 800 metres. On 2 August, she qualified for the final of the 800 metres at the 2025 UK Athletics Championships in Birmingham, placing sixth in the overall standings. Later that month, she won the women’s 800m race at the BMC Trafford Grand Prix in a new personal best of 2:00.96. In September 2025, she placed third at the Westminster Mile in London behind Holly Dixon and Khahisa Mhlanga, in 4:35. She placed second in the team event as she represented England at the Corsa dei Castelli point to point road race in Trieste, Italy, in October 2025.

Armitage opened her 2026 indoor season with an indoor personal best over 800 metres in Sheffield, running 2:04.15. On 31 January, she lowered it to 2:02.55 to win the 800 metres at EAP Glasgow ahead of Emily Simpson and Shaikira King. The following month, Armitage won the British Universities and Colleges Sport (BUCS) Indoor Championships competing for Manchester Metropolitan University, setting a new championship record time for the 800 metres. On 7 June, Armitage placed sixth over 800 metres at the 2026 Bauhausgalan in Stockholm. In June, she placed third in the final of the 800 metres at the 2026 British Championships in a personal best 2:00.45, having won her semi-final in 2:02.97.

== Athletic Achievements ==
=== Personal bests ===
Type	Distance	Time (s)	Venue	Date	Notes
Indoor	800 metres sh	2:02.55	Glasgow, United Kingdom	31 January 2026	
Indoor	1500 metres sh	4:22.39	Sheffield, United Kingdom	16 February 2025	
Outdoor	400 metres	55.71	Liverpool, United Kingdom	5 July 2025	
Outdoor	800 metres	2:00.45	Birmingham, United Kingdom	21 June 2026	
Outdoor	1500 metres	4:19.25	Oxford, United Kingdom	16 August 2025	
Outdoor	3000 metres	9:48.69	York, United Kingdom	31 May 2025	
Outdoor	5 kilometres road	16:27	Leicester, United Kingdom	15 March 2025	
Outdoor	10 kilometres road	34:53	Trieste, Italy	19 October 2025	

=== National championships and competitions ===
Year	Competition	Venue	Position	Event	Time	Notes
2022	England Championships, U20 events	Bedford	—	1500 m	4:37.86	PB
2023	England Championships, U20 events	Chelmsford	—	800 m	2:11.80	
2024	British Championships	Manchester	—	800 m	2:08.68	
2024	England Championships, U23 events	Birmingham	4th	1500 m	4:22.73	PB
2025	Welsh Championships	Cardiff	1st	800 m	2:03.36	
2025	British Championships	Birmingham	8th	800 m	2:04.11	
2026	British Championships	Birmingham	3rd	800 m	2:00.45	PB
