= Catharina Weiss =

German wheelchair basketball player (born 2000)

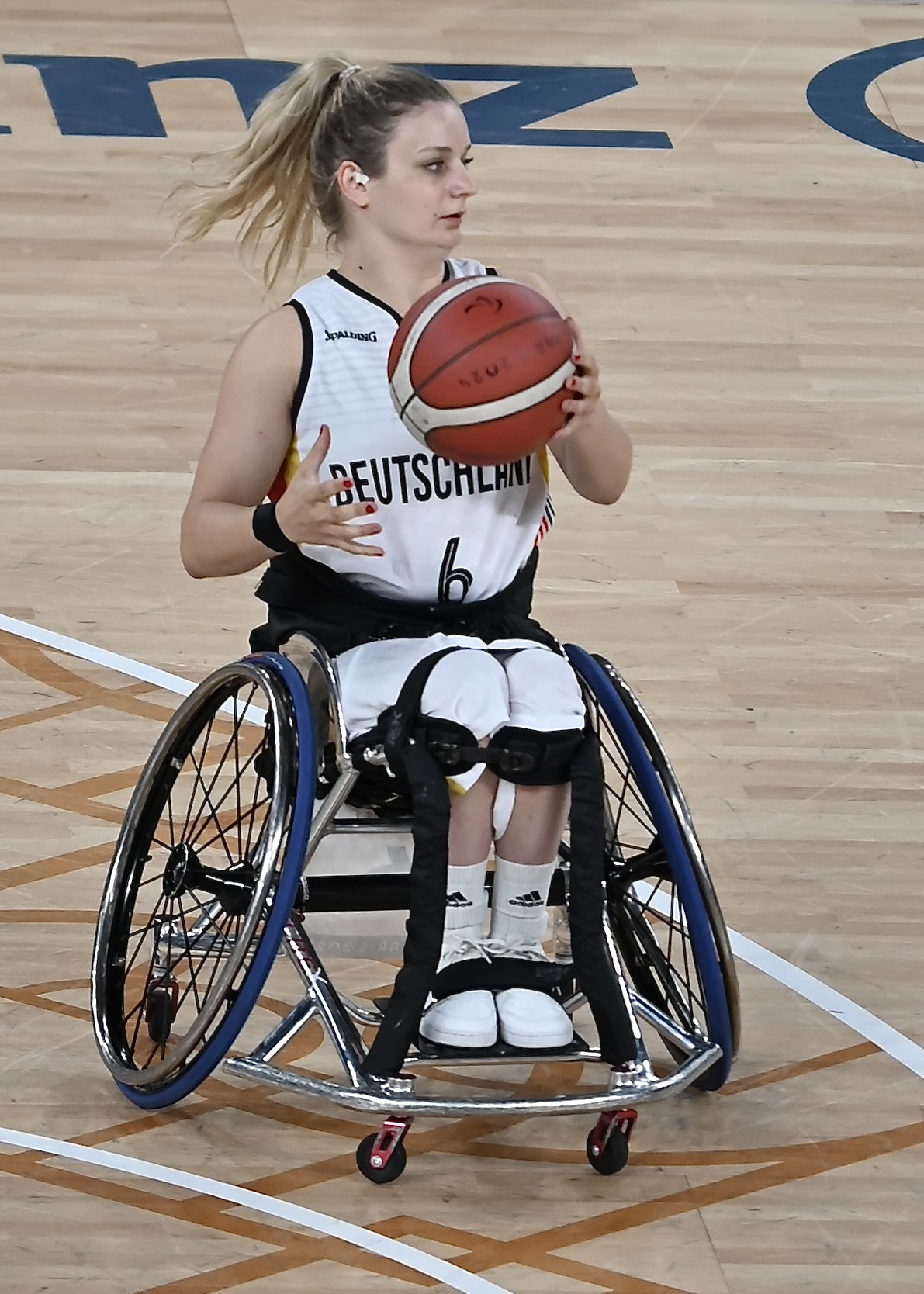
- Catherina Weiss in Olyampic

Personal information
- Full name: Catharina Jule Weiss
- Nationality: Germany
- Born: 2 June 2000 (age 26) Stuttgart, Germany

Sport
- Sport: Wheelchair basketball
- Disability class: 1.0
- Event: Wheelchair Basketball
- College team: University of Alabama
- Team: RSV Lahn-Dill

Achievements and titles
- Paralympic finals: 2020 Paralympics, 2024 Paralympics
Medal record
IWBF World Championship
Bronze medal – third place	2018 Hamburg	Women's wheelchair basketball
Summer Universiade
Gold medal – first place	2025 Rhine-Ruhr	Wheelchair 3x3

Catharina Jule Weiss (German: Weiß, born 2 June 2000) is a German 1.0 point wheelchair basketball player, who played for the German national team at the 2020 Summer Paralympics in Tokyo and the 2024 Summer Paralympics in Paris.

== Biography ==
Catharina Weiss was born in Stuttgart, Germany. She attended the Käthe Kollwitz School in Esslingen-Zell, from which she graduated in 2019. Her spinal cord was damaged by a tumor when she was two months old. She was active in sports, including swimming, monoski and wheelchair basketball, which she first took up at the age of nine. She is classified as a 1.0 point player.

The club RSKV Tübingen held a monthly training session for young people, which Weiss joined. She began attending weekly training sessions, and then played in state and regional competitions, eventually playing for the Rolling Chocolate in Heidelberg in the 2015/2016 season. Two years later she moved to the Ulm Sabres, on the grounds that Ulm was slightly closer than Heidelberg. In 2018, she was part of the national team at the 2018 Wheelchair Basketball World Championship in Hamburg, where the German side defeated China to win bronze.

In 2019, Weiss was awarded a sports scholarship to the University of Alabama, which has a distinguished wheelchair basketball team, and began studying marketing and business there. She joined the club RSV Lahn-Dill in 2020, and was part of its side that won the 2021 champions' league and the 2022 national championship. In March 2024, she announced that she was leaving RSV Lahn-Dill at the end of the 2023/2024 season.

Weiss was named as one of the All-Star Five at the 2019 Women's U25 Wheelchair Basketball World Championship, and went on to play with the national team at the 2020 Summer Paralympics in Tokyo, the 2021 IWBF Women's European Championship in Madrid, the 2022 Wheelchair Basketball World Championships in Dubai, the 2023 IWBF Women's European Championship in Rotterdam and the 2024 Summer Paralympics in Paris.

== Achievements ==
- 2017: Silver at European Wheelchair Basketball Championship (Tenerife, Spain)
- 2018: Bronze at the 2018 Wheelchair Basketball World Championship (Hamburg, Germany)
- 2019: Bronze at the 2019 IWBF Women's European Championship (Rotterdam, Netherlands)
