= Lilly Sellak =

German wheelchair basketball player

Personal information
- Born: 23 November 2002 (age 23) Lauf an der Pegnitz, Germany

Sport
- Sport: Wheelchair basketball
Medal record
Representing Germany
Summer Universiade
Gold medal – first place	2025 Rhine-Ruhr	Wheelchair 3x3

Lilly Sellak (born 23 November 2002) is a German wheelchair basketball player who competes in international basketball competitions. She is a Universiade champion and has competed at the 2024 Summer Paralympics.

At age 16, Sellak was hit by a tram on her way to school which caused her to have an incomplete spinal cord injury.
