= Veronica Vancardo =

Swiss middle-distance runner

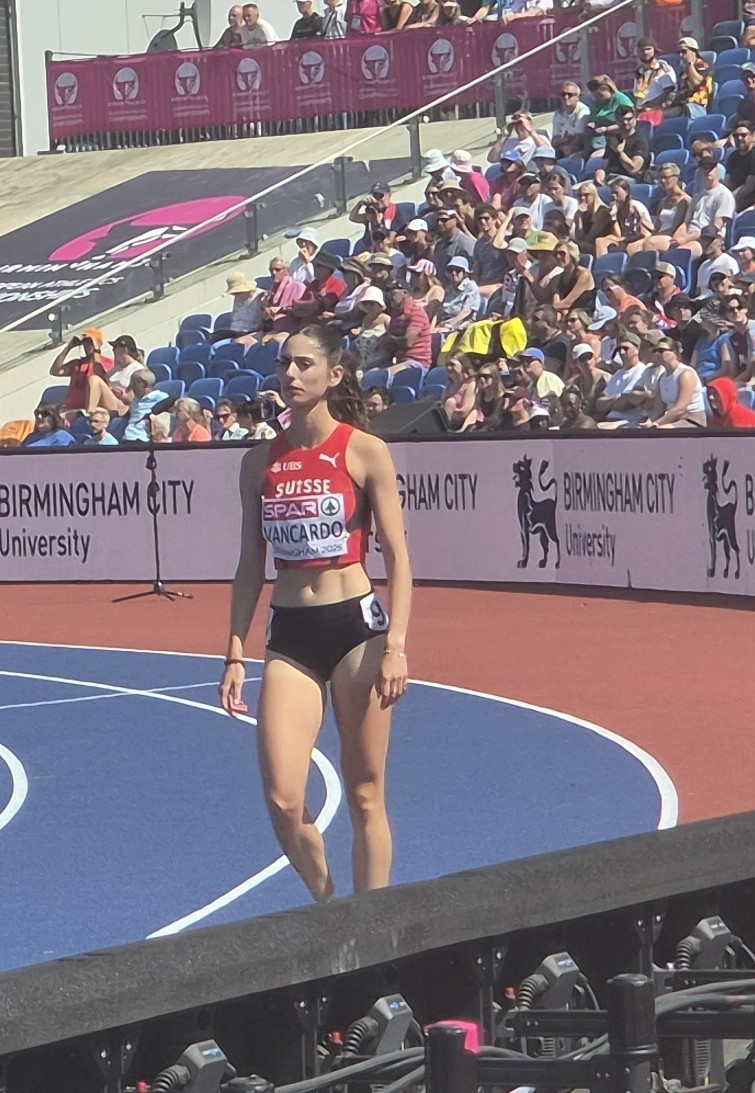
- 2026 European Championships

Personal information
- Born: 26 September 2000 (age 26)

Sport
- Sport: Athletics
- Event: Middle-distance running

Achievements and titles
- Personal best: 800 m: 1:58.20 (2026)
Medal record
Women's athletics
Representing Switzerland
Diamond League
Third place	2026	800 m
World University Games
Silver medal – second place	2025 Bochum	800 m
Bronze medal – third place	2021 Chengdu	4 × 400 m relay

Veronica Vancardo (born 26 September 2000) is a Swiss middle-distance runner.

== Early and personal life ==
She is from Fribourg in the Sarine District of Switzerland. She was educated at Collège Saint-Michel in Fribourg. After college she spent time training in Lyon, France. She later studied law at a Swiss distance university.

== Career ==
She runs as a member of CA Fribourg having previously been a member of TSV Düdingen. She competed over 400 metres before later transitioning to 800 metres. She represented Switzerland at the 2018 World Athletics U20 Championships in Tampere, Finland, where she was a semi-finalist over 400 metres.

She won the bronze medal at the delayed 2021 Summer University Games in Chengdu, China, in August 2023 in the women's 4 × 400 metres relay. At the games, she also placed sixth in 2:07.13 minutes in the 800 metres in her first international individual final. However, her performance also included by a gesture of compassion after she crossed the line when, with South African bronze medalist Charne Swart, she raced back to help the final finisher, Soudi-Thasmy Moussa of Comoros, who had collapsed on the track and helped her to her feet, both earning a special Fair Play award for their actions.

In June 2025, competing in Kladno, Czechia, Vancardo went below two minutes for the first time in the 800 m, running 1:59.81 to take 1.55 seconds from her previous personal best set just a month prior. She won the silver medal over 800 metres of at the 2025 Summer World University Games in Bochum, Germany in 2:00.08.

She finished third over 800 metres at the Swiss Athletics Championships in August 2025, behind Audrey Werro and Lore Hoffmann, in a new personal best time of 1:59.10. She competed in the women's 800 metres at the 2025 World Athletics Championships in Tokyo, Japan.

In May 2026, Vancardo won over 800 metres at the Canarias Athletics Invitational in Tenerife. At the Meeting International de Forbach in France later that month, she won over 800m in 2:00.30. Competing at the European Championships in August, in Birmingham, England, she was a finalist in the 800 metres, placing eighth overall, having run a new personal best of 1:58.20. Competing in the Diamond League at the 2026 Athletissima in Lausanne, Switzerland on 21 August 2026, she placed fourth with 1:58.68. At the 2026 Diamond League Final in Brussels on 5 September, she initially placed fourth but was promoted to third after Saida Tsehaye of Ethiopia was disqualified for a lane infringement. The following week, she competed over 800 m at the inaugural World Ultimate Championship in Budapest, but was tripped from behind on the closing straight.
