= Knight Aciru =

Ugandan middle-distance runner

Personal information
- Born: 3 September 1998 (age 28)

Sport
- Sport: Athletics
- Event: Middle-distance running

Achievements and titles
- Personal bests: 800m: 2:01.79 (Kampala, 2025); 1500m: 4:08.09 (Douala, 2024)
Medal record
Women's athletics
Representing Uganda
Summer Universiade
Silver medal – second place	2021 Chengdu	800 m

Knight Aciru (born 3 September 1998) is a Ugandan middle-distance and cross country runner.

== Biography ==
Whilst a third-year accounting student at Ndejje University in Uganda, she was a silver medalist in the 800 metres at the delayed 2021 Summer World University Games held in Chengdu in August 2023 with a time of 2:04.34. In doing so, she became just the third Ugandan women to win a medal at the Games. That year, she won the Ugandan national championships over 1500 metres.

She placed fifth in the mixed relay with the Ugandan team at the 2024 World Cross Country Championships in Belgrade.

She placed sixth in the final of the 1500 metres at the delayed 2023 African Games held in Accra, Ghana in March 2024. She qualified for the final and placed fourth overall in the 1500 metres at the 2024 African Championships in Douala, Cameroon, running 4:15.39 in her heat and 4:08.09 in the final.

She competed at the 2025 World Athletics Championships in Tokyo, Japan having qualified for a place via her world ranking with a season's best time of 4:09.69, but did not advance to the semi-finals.

In July 2026, she was selected for the 2026 Commonwealth Games in Glasgow, Scotland.
