= Nicolás Villamil =

Argentine footballer (1965–2021)

Personal information
- Full name: Servando Nicolás Villamil
- Date of birth: 11 April 1965
- Place of birth: Mendoza, Argentina
- Date of death: 11 September 2021 (aged 56)
- Place of death: Tomé, Chile
- Height: 1.82 m (6 ft 0 in)
- Position: Goalkeeper

Senior career*
Years	Team	Apps	(Gls)
1982–1985	Argentino de Alvear		
1985–1986	Racing Club		
1987	Gimnasia de Mendoza		
1987	Universidad de Chile		
1988–1990	Fernández Vial		
1991–1998	Deportes Concepción		
1992	→ Everton (loan)		
1992	→ Portoviejo (loan)		
1996	→ Fdez. Vial (loan)		
1999	Ñublense		
- * Club domestic league appearances and goals

Servando Nicolás Villamil (11 April 1965 – 11 September 2021) was an Argentinian professional footballer who played for clubs in Argentina, Chile and Ecuador. He is considered an idol at the Chilean team Deportes Concepción.

== Club career ==
On 19 November 1991, and playing for Concepción, he saved a penalty while on his back to Unión Española at Santa Laura Stadium.

== Health issues and death ==
Villamil was known to have depression and diabetes.

In 2016, he was featured in a regarded chapter of En Su Propia Trampa, program of the channel Canal 13.

On 24 March 2017, his left leg had to be amputated due to complications from his diabetes.

On 11 September 2021, it was reported that Villamil had died from a heart attack. Among the referents which mourned the death of Villamil was Patricio Almendra, who declared to have known his suffering closely, noting the following:

«It's sad. Nobody wants a person to end one like this. He was suffering a lot. He ended up losing both of his legs, he had several problems not only from diabetes and ulcer. Seeing him every day was degrading, his senses were already lost. One day he even escaped from the hospital. It was quite painful».
