= Charné du Plessis =

South African middle-distance runner

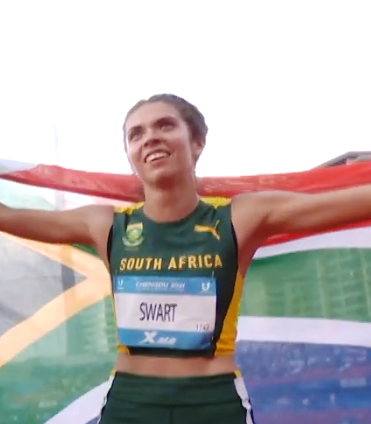
- 2021 Summer World University Games

Personal information
- Born: Charné Eileen Swart; 2 January 2002 (age 24)

Sport
- Sport: Athletics
- Event: Middle-distance running

Achievements and titles
- Personal best(s): 800m: 1:58.98 (Potchefstroom, 2025); 1500m: 4:11.80 (Pretoria, 2025)
Medal record
Women's athletics
Representing South Africa
Summer Universiade
Bronze medal – third place	2021 Chengdu	800 m

Charné Eileen Du Plessis (née Swart; born 2 January 2002) is a South African middle-distance runner.

== Career ==
She was a bronze medalist at the delayed 2021 Summer World University Games in the 800 metres, held in Chengdu in August 2023. However, her performance also included by a gesture of compassion after she crossed the line when, with Swiss athlete Veronica Vancardo, she raced back to help the final finisher, Soudi-Thasmy Moussa of Comoros, who had collapsed on the track and helped her to her feet, both earning a special Fair Play award for their actions.

In April 2024, she won the 800 metres at the South African Championships in Pietermaritzburg, in a time of 2:01:81. She qualified for the final and placed sixth overall in the 800 metres at the 2024 African Championships in Douala, Cameroon, running 2:03.49 to win her heat and 2:02.43 in the final.

In March 2025, she ran 800 meters in 1:59.86 in Pretoria to become only the sixth South African female athlete to go underneath the two-minute mark for the distance. The following month, she finished runner-up to Prudence Sekgodiso in the 800 metres at the South African Championships in Potchefstroom, in a personal best time of 1:58.98. The pair later returned to finish first and second in the 1500 metres, with Swart-Du Plessis having another second place in a time of 4:12.30. Her time for the 800 metres went below the automatic standard for the 2025 World Championships.

She competed at the 2025 Summer World University Games in Bochum, Germany, placing sixth overall in the final of the 800 metres. She ran in the women's 800 metres at the 2025 World Athletics Championships in Tokyo, Japan.

== Personal life ==
She is a medical student at the University of Pretoria. She married fellow runner Chris du Plessis in March 2025.
