= Switzerland at the 2025 Summer World University Games =

- Flag of Switzerland
- IOC code: SUI
- National federation: Swiss University Sports

in Rhine-Ruhr, Germany 16 July 2025 – 27 July 2025
- Competitors: 79 in 13 sports
- Medals Ranked 17th: Gold 3 Silver 4 Bronze 3 Total 10

Summer World University Games appearances
- 1959; 1961; 1963; 1965; 1967; 1970; 1973; 1975; 1977; 1979; 1981; 1983; 1985; 1987; 1989; 1991; 1993; 1995; 1997; 1999; 2001; 2003; 2005; 2007; 2009; 2011; 2013; 2015; 2017; 2019; 2021; 2025; 2027

Switzerland competed at the 2025 Summer World University Games in Rhine-Ruhr, Germany held from 16 to 27 July 2025. Switzerland was represented by 79 athletes and took seventeenth place in the medal table with 10 medals.

== Medal summary ==
=== Medal by sports ===
Rank	Sports	Gold	Silver	Bronze	Total
1	Athletics	2	3	1	6
2	Beach volleyball	1	0	0	1
3	Artistic gymnastics	0	1	1	2
4	Fencing	0	0	1	1
Totals (4 entries)		3	4	3	10

Source: rhineruhr2025.com

=== Medalists ===
Medal	Name	Sport	Event	Date
Gold	Simon Wieland	Athletics	Men's javelin throw	25 July
Gold	Menia Bentele; Annique Niederhauser	Beach volleyball	Women	26 July
Gold	Joceline Wind	Athletics	Women's 1500m	27 July
Silver	Veronica Vancardo	Athletics	Women's 800m	24 July
Silver	Léonie Pointet	Athletics	Women's 200m	24 July
Silver	Luca Murabito	Artistic gymnastics	Men's vault	26 July
Silver	Léonie Pointet; Soraya Becerra; Larissa Bertényi; Iris Caligiuri	Athletics	Women's 4 × 100 m relay	27 July
Bronze	Sven Vineis	Fencing	Men's épée individual	18 July
Bronze	Dominic Tamsel; Ian Raubal; Luca Murabito; Mattia Piffaretti; Tim Randegger	Artistic gymnastics	Men's team	23 July
Bronze	Nino Portmann	Athletics	Men's decathlon	26 July
