= Brazil at the 2025 Summer World University Games =

- Flag of Brazil
- IOC code: BRA
- National federation: Confederação Brasileira do Desporto Universitario

in Rhine-Ruhr, Germany 16 July 2025 – 27 July 2025
- Competitors: 121 in 13 sports
- Medals Ranked 23rd: Gold 2 Silver 3 Bronze 7 Total 12

Summer World University Games appearances
- 1959; 1961; 1963; 1965; 1967; 1970; 1973; 1975; 1977; 1979; 1981; 1983; 1985; 1987; 1989; 1991; 1993; 1995; 1997; 1999; 2001; 2003; 2005; 2007; 2009; 2011; 2013; 2015; 2017; 2019; 2021; 2025; 2027

Brazil competed at the 2025 Summer World University Games in Rhine-Ruhr, Germany held from 16 to 27 July 2025. Brazil was represented by 121 athletes and took twenty-third place in the medal table with 12 medals.

== Medal summary ==
=== Medal by sports ===
Rank	Sports	Gold	Silver	Bronze	Total
1	Taekwondo	1	1	2	4
2	Basketball	1	0	0	1
3	Judo	0	1	2	3
4	Volleyball	0	1	1	2
5	Athletics	0	0	1	1
5	Swimming	0	0	1	1
Totals (6 entries)		2	3	7	12

Source: rhineruhr2025.com

=== Medalists ===
Medal	Name	Sport	Event	Date
Gold	Maria Pacheco	Taekwondo	Women -57 kg	19 July
Gold	A Borges; G Campos; P Barbosa; A Santana; Y Neptune; R Santos / M Silva; B Cardoso; L Colimerio; A Santos; R Silva; G Souza	Basketball	Men	26 July
Silver	Vinícius Matos	Taekwondo	Men -74 kg	21 July
Silver	S Neufeld; G Ostapechen; G Souza; L da Silva; G Bieler; G Kuhnen / L Leodolter; G Alexandre; G Cardoso; M Pedrosa; P da Silva; P Santos	Volleyball	Men	24 July
Silver	Beatriz Freitas	Judo	Women -78 kg	25 July
Bronze	Lucas Peixoto; Kaique Alves; Vinicius Assunção; Pedro de Souza; Theo Alloza	Swimming	Men's 4 × 100 m freestyle relay	17 July
Bronze	Matheus Silva	Taekwondo	Men -54 kg	19 July
Bronze	Mikaela Dos Santos	Taekwondo	Women -73 kg	22 July
Bronze	Henrique Silva	Judo	Men -66 kg	23 July
Bronze	A Bento; M Brambilla; R Nogueira; S Groth; K Malachias; C Mesquita / L Besen; C Grossi; G Rodrigues; K de Souza; L Machado; E de Moura	Volleyball	Women	23 July
Bronze	João de Azevedo	Athletics	Men's triple jump	26 July
Bronze	L Carvalho; B Comanche; G Conceição; B Freitas; R Gonçalves; T Silva / L Almeida; G Arévalo; G de Oliveira; G Morais; D Nazaré; H Silva	Judo	Mixed team	26 July
