= Spain at the 2025 Summer World University Games =

- Flag of Spain
- IOC code: ESP
- National federation: Spanish University Sport Committee

in Rhine-Ruhr, Germany 16 July 2025 – 27 July 2025
- Competitors: 144 in 11 sports
- Medals Ranked 15th: Gold 3 Silver 7 Bronze 6 Total 16

Summer World University Games appearances
- 1959; 1961; 1963; 1965; 1967; 1970; 1973; 1975; 1977; 1979; 1981; 1983; 1985; 1987; 1989; 1991; 1993; 1995; 1997; 1999; 2001; 2003; 2005; 2007; 2009; 2011; 2013; 2015; 2017; 2019; 2021; 2025; 2027

Spain competed at the 2025 Summer World University Games in Rhine-Ruhr, Germany held from 16 to 27 July 2025. Spain was represented by 144 athletes and took sixteenth place in the medal table with 16 medals.

== Medal summary ==
=== Medal by sports ===
Rank	Sports	Gold	Silver	Bronze	Total
1	Athletics	2	3	4	9
2	3x3 wheelchair basketball	1	1	0	2
3	Taekwondo	0	1	1	2
4	Artistic gymnastics	0	1	0	1
4	Judo	0	1	0	1
6	Swimming	0	0	1	1
Totals (6 entries)		3	7	6	16

Source: rhineruhr2025.com

=== Medalists ===
Medal	Name	Sport	Event	Date
Gold	Alejandro García; Pablo Lavandeira; Ignacio Ortega; Adrián García	3x3 wheelchair basketball	Men's wheelchair	20 July
Gold	Una Stancev	Athletics	Women's high jump	26 July
Gold	David Barroso	Athletics	Men's 800m	27 July
Silver	Beatriz Zudaire; Sara Revuelta; Sindy Ramos; Naiara Rodríguez	3x3 wheelchair basketball	Women's wheelchair	20 July
Silver	Lena Moreno	Taekwondo	Women -67 kg	20 July
Silver	Luis Barroso López	Judo	Men -60 kg	23 July
Silver	Laia Masferrer; Ainara Sautua; Maia Llácer; Irene Ros; Lorena Medina	Artistic gymnastics	Women's team	24 July
Silver	Ángel Díaz	Athletics	Men's 110m hurdles	24 July
Silver	Adrià Alfonso	Athletics	Men's 200m	24 July
Silver	Alejandro Quijada	Athletics	Men's 3000m steeplechase	26 July
Bronze	Tomás Fernández	Taekwondo	Men's individual poomsae	17 July
Bronze	Alicia Berzosa	Athletics	Women's 10,000m	21 July
Bronze	Aina Fernández	Swimming	Women's 200m breaststroke	21 July
Bronze	Mario Priego	Athletics	Men's 10,000m	23 July
Bronze	Daniela García	Athletics	Women's 800m	24 July
Bronze	Esperança Cladera	Athletics	Women's 200m	24 July
