= Slovakia at the 2025 Summer World University Games =

- Flag of Slovakia
- IOC code: SVK
- National federation: Slovak University Sports Association

in Rhine-Ruhr, Germany 16 July 2025 – 27 July 2025
- Competitors: 61 in 12 sports
- Medals Ranked 33rd: Gold 1 Silver 1 Bronze 1 Total 3

Summer World University Games appearances
- 1993; 1995; 1997; 1999; 2001; 2003; 2005; 2007; 2009; 2011; 2013; 2015; 2017; 2019; 2021; 2025; 2027

Slovakia competed at the 2025 Summer World University Games in Rhine-Ruhr, Germany held from 16 to 27 July 2025. Slovakia was represented by 61 athletes and took thirty-third place in the medal table with three medals.

== Medal summary ==
=== Medal by sports ===
Rank	Sports	Gold	Silver	Bronze	Total
1	Tennis	1	1	0	2
2	Athletics	0	0	1	1
Totals (2 entries)		1	1	1	3

Source: rhineruhr2025.com

=== Medalists ===
Medal	Name	Sport	Event	Date
Gold	Eszter Méri	Tennis	Women's singles	26 July
Silver	Martina Marudinová; Eszter Méri	Tennis	Women's team	26 July
Bronze	Patrik Dömötör	Athletics	Men's 400m hurdles	23 July
