= 2025 European Cadets and Juniors Fencing Championships =

Fencing competition in Antalya, Turkey

- Dates: 23 February – 3 March 2025
- Organiser: European Fencing Confederation

The 2025 European Fencing Cadet and Junior Championships were held from 23 February to 3 March 2025 in Antalya, Türkiye. The event was organized by the European Fencing Confederation (EFC) in partnership with the Turkish Fencing Federation and took place at the Antalya Spor Salonu.

== Participation ==
A total of 776 athletes and 119 teams from across Europe competed in individual and team events across all three weapons: foil, épée, and sabre.

== Schedule ==
The competition was divided into cadet and junior events:

- Cadet events: 23–26 February 2025
- Junior events: 27 February – 3 March 2025

== Highlights ==
=== Cadet events ===
Italy led the cadet medal table with 12 medals, including team golds in Men's Épée, Women's Foil, and Women's Sabre. Türkiye won gold in Men's Sabre (Candeniz Berrak), Women's Foil (Alara Atmaca), and the Men's Sabre Team event., Hungary secured individual titles in Men's Épée (Donát Kiss) and Men's Foil (Hunor Kosztolányi)..Ukraine claimed gold in Women's Épée through Alina Dmytruk.

=== Junior events ===
Italy again topped the junior medal standings, with Matilde Molinari winning Women's Foil and strong team performances. Great Britain made history by winning its first-ever Junior European Team titles in Men's Épée and Men's Foil. Ukraine won Women's Épée through Anna Maksymenko. Athletes competing under the AIN designation (neutral flag) earned medals in Men's Sabre (Pavel Graudyn) and Men's Foil (Aleksandr Kerik).

== Medal summary ==
=== Medal table ===
* Host nation (Turkiye)

Rank	Nation	Gold	Silver	Bronze	Total
1	Italy	8	5	10	23
2	Ukraine	4	0	4	8
3	Hungary	3	4	4	11
4	Turkiye*	3	0	3	6
–	Neutral athletes	3	0	2	5
5	Great Britain	2	0	1	3
6	Romania	1	3	1	5
7	France	0	7	3	10
8	Poland	0	2	2	4
9	Germany	0	1	2	3
10	Bulgaria	0	1	0	1
10	Georgia	0	1	0	1
12	Belgium	0	0	1	1
12	Cyprus	0	0	1	1
12	Czechia	0	0	1	1
12	Spain	0	0	1	1
Totals (15 entries)		24	24	36	84

=== Cadet championships ===
Cadet championships are for fencers under the age of 17.

Event	Gold	Silver	Bronze
Men
Epée	Donat Kiss; Hungary	Nicolo Sonnessa; Italy	Arsenii Karapysh; Ukraine
Epée	Donat Kiss; Hungary	Nicolo Sonnessa; Italy	Francesco Delfino; Italy
Team epée	Italy; Davide del Prete; Francesco Delfino; Riccardo Magni; Nicolo Sonnessa	Hungary; Donat Kiss; Lenard Koch; Benjamin Makai; Aron Petrovszki	Belgium; Alexander De Winter; Achille Grandjean; Matthys Hercot; Wout Van Laecke
Foil	Hunor Kosztolanyi; Hungary	Marco Panazzolo; Italy	Nicolo' Collini; Italy
Foil	Hunor Kosztolanyi; Hungary	Marco Panazzolo; Italy	Lucas Robinet; France
Team foil	Italy; Nicolo' Collini; Mattia Gianese; Emanuele Iaquinta; Marco Panazzolo	France; Leo Blanchard; Mahel Boumaza; Evan Darmani; Lucas Robinet	Hungary; Aron Bodor; Roland Grosz; Hunor Kosztolanyi; Csanad Rozsa
Sabre	Candeniz Berrak; Turkey	Nikolay-Tomas Georgiev; Bulgaria	Andrea Tribuno; Italy
Sabre	Candeniz Berrak; Turkey	Nikolay-Tomas Georgiev; Bulgaria	Leonard Weber; Germany
Team sabre	Turkey; Yigit Ayaz; Candeniz Berrak; Poyraz Kumuk; Arda Takka	Italy; Christian Avaltroni; Leonardo Reale; Andrea Tribuno; Davide Vivaldi	France; Maxence Bloin; Baptiste Hospital; Ulysse le Gac Briand; Lino Vacca
Women
Epée	Alina Dmytruk; Ukraine	Ludovica Costantini; Italy	Natalia Constantin; Romania
Epée	Alina Dmytruk; Ukraine	Ludovica Costantini; Italy	Rubeen Rembi; France
Team epée	Ukraine; Marharyta Anharska; Valeriia Bilous-Gridzhak; Alina Dmytruk; Polina Spyrydonova	Hungary; Lotti Horvath; Izabella Ronaszeki; Anna Szilard; Hanna Terhes	Czech Republic; Adela Bartoskova; Natalie Coufalova; Hana Jurkova; Eliska Kahabkova
Foil	Alara Atmaca; Turkey	Karolina Makowska; Poland	Giorgia Ruta; Italy
Foil	Alara Atmaca; Turkey	Karolina Makowska; Poland	Elizaveta Kopyltsova; Cyprus
Team foil	Italy; Maria Fattori; Sofia Mancini; Giorgia Ruta; Alessandra Tavola	Poland; Michalina Bartol; Karolina Makowska; Zofia Mikulicka; Danuta Tym	Hungary; Szilvia Mahovszkij; Boglarka Markus; Borbala Simon; Xinyao Zhou
Sabre	Francesca Lentini; Italy	Amalia Covaliu; Romania	Boglarka Komjathy; Hungary
Sabre	Francesca Lentini; Italy	Amalia Covaliu; Romania	irmak Senoglu; Turkey
Team sabre	Italy; Vittoria Fusetti; Francesca Lentini; Vittoria Mocci; Anna Torre	Hungary; Szonja Felfoldi; Boglarka Komjathy; Adel Kovacs; Brigitta Racz	Turkey; Irem Guner; Duru Ayse Ozgonul; Ece Ozturk irmak Senoglu

=== Junior championships ===
Junior championships are for fenders under the age of 20.

Event	Gold	Silver	Bronze
Women
Epée	Anna Maksymenko; Ukraine	Emma Sont; Romania	Emily Conrad; Ukraine
Epée	Anna Maksymenko; Ukraine	Emma Sont; Romania	Cecylia Cieslik; Poland
Team epée	Ukraine; Valeriia Bilous-Gridzhak; Emily Conrad; Alina Dmytruk; Anna Maksymenko	Hungary; Greta Gachalyi; Lotti Horvath; Blanka Virag Nagy; Dorina Wimmer	Italy; Allegra Cristofoletto; Eleonora Orso; Giulia Paulis; Elisa Treglia
Foil	Matilde Molinari; Italy	Letizia Gabola; Italy	Kristina Petrova; Ukraine
Foil	Matilde Molinari; Italy	Letizia Gabola; Italy	Ludovica Franzoni; Italy
Team foil	Italy; Greta Collini; Ludovica Franzoni; Letizia Gabola; Matilde Molinari	France; Alicia Audibert; Keren Aye; Garance Martin; Garance Roger	Great Britain; Megan Elliott; Isabella Johnson; Amelie Tsang; Zoe Wagstaff
Sabre	Aleksandra Mikhailova; Individual Neutral Athletes	Alexandra Kuvaeva; Georgia	Gaia Karola Carafa; Italy
Sabre	Aleksandra Mikhailova; Individual Neutral Athletes	Alexandra Kuvaeva; Georgia	Vittoria Mocci; Italy
Team sabre	Romania; Rosemarie Benciu; Amalia Covaliu; Catinca Dumitru; Anastasia Fusea	France; Roxane Chabrol; Elea Faur; Alejandra Manga; Rita Robineaux	Ukraine; Sofia Holovkina; Viktoriia Korotchenko; Valeriia Morenets-Kubanska; Maiia Velychko
Men
Epée	Domonkos Pelle; Hungary	Matthew Buelau; Germany	Marco Francesco Locatelli; Italy
Epée	Domonkos Pelle; Hungary	Matthew Buelau; Germany	Bartosz Kuznik; Poland
Team epée	Great Britain; Cador Beautyman; Alec Brooke; Tristan Lumineau; Sameer Sunder-Rajan	France; Odinn Bindas; Noam Duchene; Etienne Imbert; Aina Rahamefy	Spain; Jaime de la Cal Guijarro; Jose Miguel Martin Gamazo; Rayan Rami Rozpide; Ricardo Sanchez Almoguera
Foil	Aleksandr Kerik; Individual Neutral Athletes	Adrien Helmy-Cocoynacq; France	Pavel Puzankov; Individual Neutral Athletes
Foil	Aleksandr Kerik; Individual Neutral Athletes	Adrien Helmy-Cocoynacq; France	Iskander Bulatov; Individual Neutral Athletes
Team foil	Great Britain; Jaimie Cook; David Kelly; Callum Penman; David Sosnov	France; Numa Crist; Adrien Helmy-Cocoynacq; Louis Pradel; Antoine Spichiger	Germany; Henrik Barby; Niklas Diestelkamp; Ruben Lindner; Linus Schulz
Sabre	Pavel Graudyn; Individual Neutral Athletes	Vlad Covaliu; Romania	Leonardo Reale; Italy
Sabre	Pavel Graudyn; Individual Neutral Athletes	Vlad Covaliu; Romania	Zsadany Papp; Hungary
Team sabre	Italy; Cosimo Bertini; Edoardo Reale; Leonardo Reale; Valerio Reale	France; Baptiste Baylac; Tom Couderc; Roman Fraboulet; Lucas Guilley	Turkey; Tolga Aslan; Enes Talha Kalender; Adem Doruk Kupeli; Furkan Yaman
