= 2023 European Cadets and Juniors Fencing Championships =

Fencing competition held in Tallinn, Estonia

- Dates: 21–28 February 2023

The 2023 European Cadets and Juniors Fencing Championships were held in Tallinn, Estonia from 21 to 28 February 2023 at the Tallink Tennis Centre. The championships featured individual and team competitions in all three weapons (épée, foil and sabre) for cadet (U17) and junior (U20) categories and were organised under the auspices of the European Fencing Confederation.

== Background ==
Tallinn was selected as host due to its proven track record in organizing international fencing events, including the U23 European Championships. The mayor of Tallinn and the Estonian minister of culture welcomed the event as a celebration of youth sport and international cooperation.

== Venue ==
The championships took place at the Tallink Tennis Centre, which provided multiple pistes and facilities for athletes, officials, and spectators. The venue was adapted for simultaneous cadet and junior competitions across all three weapons: épée, foil, and sabre.

== Schedule ==
The competition was divided into two segments:

- Cadet (U17) competitions: 21–24 February 2023.
- Junior (U20) competitions: 25–28 February 2023.

Each segment included individual and team events for men and women. The opening ceremony was held on 21 February following the first day of cadet individual events.

== Notable performances ==
Italy, France, and Hungary dominated the medal standings, with strong performances across both cadet and junior categories. Several athletes achieved double podium finishes in individual and team events.

== Officials and organization ==
The event was overseen by EFC President Giorgio Scarso and featured a full roster of international referees and commission delegates. More than 40 national federations affiliated with the EFC sent delegations. Each country was permitted to enter up to four athletes per individual event and one team per weapon category.

== Medal summary ==
=== Cadet Championships ===
Event	Gold	Silver	Bronze
Women
Épée	Emily Conrad; Ukraine	Sofija Prosina; Latvia	Anna Maksymenko; Ukraine
Épée	Emily Conrad; Ukraine	Sofija Prosina; Latvia	Cagla Aytekin; Germany
Team épée	Hungary; Greta Gachalyi; Lotti Horvath; Blanka Virag Nagy; Hanna Terhes	Poland; Antonina Halemba; Oliwia Janeczek; Magda Ratyna; Aleksandra Szymanska	Ukraine; Emily Conrad; Anna Maksymenko; Ustina Ohon; Polina Spyrydonova
Foil	Vittoria Pinna; Italy	Greta Collini; Italy	Anna Kollar; Hungary
Foil	Vittoria Pinna; Italy	Greta Collini; Italy	Uliana-Dumitrita Josan; Moldova
Team foil	Italy; Mariavittoria Elvira Berretta; Greta Collini; Sofia Giordani; Vittoria Pinna	Poland; Marta Jakubowska; Natasza Kus; Aleksandra Nowakowska; Hanna Wojtas	Hungary; Szonja Badar; Anna Kollar; Jazmin Papp; Jazmin Sperka
Sabre	Emese Domonkos; Hungary	Amalia Covaliu; Romania	Anastasia Fusea; Romania
Sabre	Emese Domonkos; Hungary	Amalia Covaliu; Romania	Aurore Patrice; France
Team sabre	Romania; Rosemarie Benciu; Amalia Covaliu; Anastasia Fusea; Alexandra Mitrus	Hungary; Dorottya Csonka; Emese Domonkos; Csenge Konya; Nadin Toth	Italy; Elisabetta Borrelli; Gaia Karola Carafa; Giada Likaj; Benedetta Stangoni
Men
Épée	Leonardo Cortini; Italy	Szymon Wojciechowski; Poland	Domonkos Pelle; Hungary
Épée	Leonardo Cortini; Italy	Szymon Wojciechowski; Poland	Alon Sarid; Israel
Team épée	Hungary; Bence Balazs; Mark Horvath; Matyas Kiraly; Domonkos Pelle	Italy; Dario Benetti; Leonardo Cortini; Ettore Leporati; Cristiano Sena	Great Britain; Cador Beautyman; Tristan Lumineau; Sameer Sunder Rajan; Cheney Zhu
Foil	Mattia Rubin; Hungary	Eitan Lemberger; Israel	Andrii Cherkashyn; Ukraine
Foil	Mattia Rubin; Hungary	Eitan Lemberger; Israel	Mattia De Cristofaro; Italy
Team foil	Italy; Mattia De Cristofaro; Elia Pasin; Jacopo Poggio; Fernando Scalora	Great Britain; Mihkel Archer; Aarav Chaudhari; Callum Penman; David Sosnov	Israel; Matthew Haral Amrani; Evyatar Koren; Eitan Lemberger; Ran Traitel Crystal
Sabre	Oszkar Vajda; Hungary	Casian Cidu; Romania	Tom Couderc; France
Sabre	Oszkar Vajda; Hungary	Casian Cidu; Romania	Enes Kalender; Turkey
Team sabre	Italy; Matteo Ottaviani; Francesco Pagano; Leonardo Reale; Massimo Sibillo	Romania; Casian Cidu; Dacian Enache; Alexandru Eva; Cristian Macovei	Hungary; Matyas Monori; Zsadany Papp; Zalan Szalai; Oszkar Vajda

=== Junior championships ===
Event	Gold	Silver	Bronze
Women
Épée	Gloria Klughardt; Poland	Nikol Feigin; Israel	Kinga Zgryzniak; Poland
Épée	Gloria Klughardt; Poland	Nikol Feigin; Israel	Alexandra Kravets; Israel
Team épée	Poland; Cecylia Cieslik; Alicja Klasik; Gloria Klughardt; Kinga Zgryzniak	France; Juliette Baudinot; Anaelle Doquet; Oceane Francillonne; Elena Seille	Israel; Adele Bogdanov; Nicole Feygin; Alexandra Kravets; Sophia Vainberg
Foil	Giulia Amore; Italy	Kristina Petrova; Ukraine	Ariadna Tucker; Spain
Foil	Giulia Amore; Italy	Kristina Petrova; Ukraine	Carolina Stutchbury; Great Britain
Team foil	Italy; Giulia Amore; Matilde Calvanese; Carlotta Ferrari; Aurora Grandis	Israel; Lior Druck; May Kagan Tyagunov; Lihi Peer Koren; Gili Kuritzky	Poland; Malwina Kolodziejczyk; Antonina Lachman; Amelia Olszewska; Karolina Zurawska
Sabre	Mathilde Mouroux; France	Nisanur Erbil; Turkey	Kira Keszei; Hungary
Sabre	Mathilde Mouroux; France	Nisanur Erbil; Turkey	Amalia Stan; Romania
Team sabre	Hungary; Sugar Katinka Battai; Dorottya Csonka; Kira Keszei; Anna Spiesz	Italy; Carlotta Fusetti; Michela Landi; Maria Clementina Polli; Manuela Spica	Turkey; Begum Alkaya; Damla Demirkol; Nisanur Erbil; Nil Gungor
Men
Épée	Yonatan Cohen; Israel	Markus Salm; Estonia	Marco Paganelli; Italy
Épée	Yonatan Cohen; Israel	Markus Salm; Estonia	Soma Somody; Hungary
Team épée	Hungary; Mate Csabai; Gergely Kovacs; Viktor Kulcsar; Soma Somody	Italy; Nicolo del Contrasto; Matteo Galassi; Simone Mencarelli; Marco Paganelli	France; Bastien Archambeaud; Mael Denaux; Lino Heurlin Vazquez; Junes Lechevalier Boiseel
Foil	Adam Jakubowski; Poland	Marcus Broberg; Sweden	Albert Bagdany; Hungary
Foil	Adam Jakubowski; Poland	Marcus Broberg; Sweden	Niklas Diestelkamp; Germany
Team foil	France; Wael Abdeljalil; Anas Anane; Eliot Chagnon; Adrien Spichiger	Poland; Adam Jakubowski; Piotr Kaskow; Jakub Kotek; Mateusz Kwiatkowski	Hungary; Albert Bagdany; Ambrus Budahazy; Mattia Rubin; Gergo Szemes
Sabre	Marco Mastrullo; Italy	Darii Lukashenko; Ukraine	Casian Cidu; Romania
Sabre	Marco Mastrullo; Italy	Darii Lukashenko; Ukraine	Tolga Aslan; Turkey
Team sabre	Romania; Casian Cidu; Vlad Covaliu; Mihnea Enache; Radu Nitu	Hungary; Kornel Pech; Mirko Petrucz; Bertalan Toth; Benedek Vigh	Spain; Jaime Florez; Santiago Madrigal; Yago Moran; Asier Olangua

=== Medal table ===
* Host nation (Estonia)

Rank	Nation	Gold	Silver	Bronze	Total
1	Italy (ITA)	8	4	3	15
2	Hungary (HUN)	7	2	8	17
3	Poland (POL)	3	4	2	9
4	Romania (ROU)	2	3	3	8
5	France (FRA)	2	1	3	6
6	Israel (ISR)	1	3	4	8
7	Ukraine (UKR)	1	2	3	6
8	Turkey (TUR)	0	1	3	4
9	Great Britain (GBR)	0	1	2	3
10	Estonia (EST)*	0	1	0	1
10	Latvia (LAT)	0	1	0	1
10	Sweden (SWE)	0	1	0	1
13	Germany (GER)	0	0	2	2
13	Spain (ESP)	0	0	2	2
15	Moldova (MDA)	0	0	1	1
Totals (15 entries)		24	24	36	84
