= Fencing at the 2025 Summer World University Games – Women's individual épée =

Women's individual épée at the 2025 Summer World University Games
- Venue: Messe Essen
- Location: Essen
- Dates: 17 July
- Competitors: 100 from 38 nations

Medalists
| gold medal | Kaylin Hsieh | Hong Kong |
| silver medal | Anna Maksymenko | Ukraine |
| bronze medal | Emily Conrad | Ukraine |
| bronze medal | Edina Kardos | Hungary |

The women's individual épée at the 2025 Summer World University Games in Rhine-Ruhr, Germany was held 17 July 2025. Kaylin Hsieh of Hong Kong won the gold medal, Anna Maksymenko of Ukraine took the silver, and Emily Conrad of Ukraine alongside Edina Cardos of Hungary both earned bronze.

== Pool Results ==
100 fencers are seeded and divided into small groups, usually consisting of 6 or 7 athletes. Every fencer competes against every other opponent within their assigned pool. Each pool bout lasts until a fencer scores 5 touches or until the 3-minute time limit expires. Results (victory-to-match ratio and touch indicators) establish an overall ranking. The lowest-ranked fencers are eliminated immediately, while the rest advance to the knockout stage.

| Qualified for Table of 64 |
| Qualified for Table of 128 |

=== Pool 1 ===
| # | Seed | Athlete | 1 | 2 | 3 | 4 | 5 | 6 | 7 | V# | M# | Ind. | TG | TR | Diff. | RP |
|---|---|---|---|---|---|---|---|---|---|---|---|---|---|---|---|---|
| 1 | 60 | Mizuki Homma (JPN) | | V_{5} | V_{5} | V_{5} | D_{3} | V_{5} | V_{5} | 5 | 6 | 0.83 | 28 | 15 | 13 | 2 |
| 2 | 30 | Genevieve Gilarski (AUS) | D_{2} | | V_{5} | D_{1} | D_{4} | D_{4} | D_{3} | 1 | 6 | 0.17 | 19 | 24 | -5 | 5 |
| 3 | 90 | Ela Simčič (SLO) | D_{1} | D_{0} | | D_{1} | D_{0} | V_{5} | D_{0} | 1 | 6 | 0.17 | 7 | 29 | -22 | 7 |
| 4 | 91 | Park Ha-been (KOR) | D_{2} | V_{5} | V_{5} | | D_{3} | V_{5} | D_{2} | 3 | 6 | 0.50 | 22 | 21 | 1 | 4 |
| 5 | 31 | Lisa Löhr (GER) | V_{5} | V_{5} | V_{5} | V_{5} | | V_{5} | D_{0} | 5 | 6 | 0.83 | 25 | 17 | 8 | 3 |
| 6 | 61 | Iris Matskevits (EST) | D_{3} | V_{5} | D_{4} | D_{4} | D_{3} | | D_{1} | 1 | 6 | 0.17 | 20 | 29 | -9 | 6 |
| 7 | 1 | Kaylin Hsieh (HKG) | D_{2} | V_{4} | V_{5} | V_{5} | V_{4} | V_{5} | | 5 | 6 | 0.83 | 25 | 11 | 14 | 1 |

=== Pool 2 ===
| # | Seed | Athlete | 1 | 2 | 3 | 4 | 5 | 6 | 7 | V# | M# | Ind. | TG | TR | Diff. | RP |
|---|---|---|---|---|---|---|---|---|---|---|---|---|---|---|---|---|
| 1 | 59 | Dinara Anis (EST) | | D_{3} | D_{4} | V_{5} | D_{4} | D_{4} | D_{3} | 1 | 6 | 0.17 | 23 | 27 | -4 | 7 |
| 2 | 2 | Anna Maksymenko (UKR) | V_{5} | | D_{2} | V_{5} | V_{5} | V_{4} | V_{5} | 5 | 6 | 0.83 | 26 | 19 | 7 | 1 |
| 3 | 89 | Karina Dyner (CRC) | V_{5} | V_{3} | | V_{5} | D_{4} | V_{5} | D_{3} | 4 | 6 | 0.67 | 25 | 21 | 4 | 2 |
| 4 | 62 | Vilde Tengesdal (NOR) | D_{3} | D_{4} | D_{3} | | V_{5} | V_{5} | D_{2} | 2 | 6 | 0.33 | 22 | 26 | -4 | 5 |
| 5 | 32 | Anne Bultynck (BEL) | V_{5} | D_{2} | V_{5} | D_{4} | | V_{4} | V_{3} | 4 | 6 | 0.67 | 23 | 23 | 0 | 3 |
| 6 | 92 | Katelijn Kroese (NED) | V_{5} | D_{3} | D_{3} | D_{2} | D_{3} | | V_{5} | 2 | 6 | 0.33 | 21 | 26 | -5 | 6 |
| 7 | 29 | Amelie Yee (AUS) | V_{4} | D_{4} | V_{4} | V_{5} | D_{2} | D_{4} | | 3 | 6 | 0.50 | 23 | 21 | 2 | 4 |

=== Pool 3 ===
| # | Seed | Athlete | 1 | 2 | 3 | 4 | 5 | 6 | 7 | V# | M# | Ind. | TG | TR | Diff. | RP |
|---|---|---|---|---|---|---|---|---|---|---|---|---|---|---|---|---|
| 1 | 63 | Rayllen Prafil (ARG) | | D_{4} | D_{0} | D_{4} | D_{3} | D_{4} | D_{2} | 0 | 6 | 0.00 | 17 | 28 | -11 | 7 |
| 2 | 33 | Dorina Wimmer (HUN) | V_{5} | | D_{2} | V_{5} | D_{3} | D_{4} | D_{3} | 2 | 6 | 0.33 | 22 | 25 | -3 | 5 |
| 3 | 88 | Christina Watrall (USA) | V_{3} | V_{5} | | D_{3} | D_{4} | V_{4} | D_{2} | 3 | 6 | 0.50 | 21 | 20 | 1 | 3 |
| 4 | 28 | Iulia Izzo (SUI) | V_{5} | D_{1} | V_{5} | | D_{1} | V_{5} | D_{2} | 3 | 6 | 0.50 | 19 | 25 | -6 | 4 |
| 5 | 3 | Lim Tae-hee (KOR) | V_{5} | V_{5} | V_{5} | V_{5} | | V_{5} | D_{3} | 5 | 6 | 0.83 | 28 | 18 | 10 | 2 |
| 6 | 58 | Aušrinė Šimkutė (LTU) | V_{5} | V_{5} | D_{3} | D_{3} | D_{2} | | D_{3} | 2 | 6 | 0.33 | 21 | 27 | -6 | 6 |
| 7 | 94 | Taisiia Larkina (AIN) | V_{5} | V_{5} | V_{5} | V_{5} | V_{5} | V_{5} | | 6 | 6 | 1.00 | 30 | 15 | 15 | 1 |

=== Pool 4 ===
| # | Seed | Athlete | 1 | 2 | 3 | 4 | 5 | 6 | 7 | V# | M# | Ind. | TG | TR | Diff. | RP |
|---|---|---|---|---|---|---|---|---|---|---|---|---|---|---|---|---|
| 1 | 27 | Moa Maaninka (SWE) | | V_{5} | D_{1} | D_{3} | D_{0} | D_{3} | D_{3} | 1 | 6 | 0.17 | 15 | 29 | -14 | 6 |
| 2 | 87 | Lyka Phat (CAM) | D_{4} | | D_{2} | D_{0} | D_{1} | D_{2} | D_{3} | 0 | 6 | 0.00 | 12 | 29 | -17 | 7 |
| 3 | 4 | Emily Conrad (UKR) | V_{5} | V_{5} | | V_{5} | D_{3} | D_{1} | V_{5} | 4 | 6 | 0.67 | 24 | 19 | 5 | 4 |
| 4 | 64 | Patricie Prokšíková (CZE) | V_{5} | V_{5} | D_{3} | | V_{5} | D_{2} | V_{5} | 4 | 6 | 0.67 | 25 | 20 | 5 | 3 |
| 5 | 57 | Candela Lozano (ESP) | V_{5} | V_{5} | V_{5} | D_{3} | | D_{0} | V_{3} | 4 | 6 | 0.67 | 21 | 12 | 9 | 2 |
| 6 | 34 | Alexandra Zittel (GER) | V_{5} | V_{5} | V_{4} | V_{5} | V_{1} | | V_{5} | 6 | 6 | 1.00 | 25 | 9 | 16 | 1 |
| 7 | 93 | Natalie Gebala (USA) | V_{5} | V_{4} | D_{4} | D_{4} | D_{2} | D_{1} | | 2 | 6 | 0.33 | 20 | 24 | -4 | 5 |

=== Pool 5 ===
| # | Seed | Athlete | 1 | 2 | 3 | 4 | 5 | 6 | 7 | V# | M# | Ind. | TG | TR | Diff. | RP |
|---|---|---|---|---|---|---|---|---|---|---|---|---|---|---|---|---|
| 1 | 86 | Nazila Rahimova (AZE) | | V_{5} | D_{4} | V_{4} | D_{3} | D_{4} | V_{5} | 3 | 6 | 0.50 | 25 | 22 | 3 | 2 |
| 2 | 26 | Lara Goldmann (GER) | D_{3} | | V_{5} | V_{5} | D_{3} | D_{4} | V_{5} | 3 | 6 | 0.50 | 25 | 22 | 3 | 2 |
| 3 | 35 | Elena Ferracuti (ITA) | V_{5} | D_{4} | | D_{3} | V_{5} | D_{2} | V_{5} | 3 | 6 | 0.50 | 24 | 22 | 2 | 4 |
| 4 | 56 | Polina Kuleshova (UKR) | D_{3} | D_{1} | V_{5} | | V_{5} | D_{3} | V_{5} | 3 | 6 | 0.50 | 22 | 21 | 1 | 5 |
| 5 | 65 | Leana Mironov (EST) | V_{5} | V_{4} | D_{2} | D_{4} | | D_{3} | V_{5} | 3 | 6 | 0.50 | 23 | 23 | 0 | 6 |
| 6 | 5 | Emma Fransson (SWE) | V_{5} | V_{5} | V_{3} | V_{5} | V_{5} | | V_{5} | 6 | 6 | 1.00 | 28 | 18 | 10 | 1 |
| 7 | 95 | Fawzya Al-Khibiri (KSA) | D_{1} | D_{3} | D_{3} | D_{0} | D_{2} | D_{2} | | 0 | 6 | 0.00 | 11 | 30 | -19 | 7 |

=== Pool 6 ===
| # | Seed | Athlete | 1 | 2 | 3 | 4 | 5 | 6 | 7 | V# | M# | Ind. | TG | TR | Diff. | RP |
|---|---|---|---|---|---|---|---|---|---|---|---|---|---|---|---|---|
| 1 | 36 | Sofiia Sidenko (UKR) | | V_{5} | D_{3} | D_{2} | D_{3} | V_{5} | V_{5} | 3 | 6 | 0.50 | 23 | 24 | -1 | 4 |
| 2 | 55 | Harriet Hillier (GBR) | D_{4} | | V_{5} | V_{4} | V_{5} | V_{4} | D_{2} | 4 | 6 | 0.67 | 24 | 22 | 2 | 3 |
| 3 | 96 | Hania Hafeez (USA) | V_{5} | D_{4} | | D_{2} | V_{5} | D_{2} | D_{4} | 2 | 6 | 0.33 | 22 | 21 | 1 | 5 |
| 4 | 6 | Carola Maccagno (ITA) | V_{5} | D_{2} | V_{5} | | V_{5} | V_{5} | D_{2} | 4 | 6 | 0.67 | 24 | 14 | 10 | 2 |
| 5 | 84 | Sienna Stephens (AUS) | V_{5} | D_{3} | D_{0} | D_{1} | | D_{1} | D_{2} | 1 | 6 | 0.17 | 12 | 28 | -16 | 7 |
| 6 | 66 | Anna Orlova (LAT) | D_{1} | D_{3} | V_{3} | D_{2} | V_{5} | | D_{1} | 2 | 6 | 0.33 | 15 | 22 | -7 | 6 |
| 7 | 25 | Yuval Yizhaki (ISR) | D_{4} | V_{5} | V_{5} | V_{3} | V_{5} | V_{5} | | 5 | 6 | 0.83 | 27 | 16 | 11 | 1 |

=== Pool 7 ===
| # | Seed | Athlete | 1 | 2 | 3 | 4 | 5 | 6 | 7 | V# | M# | Ind. | TG | TR | Diff. | RP |
|---|---|---|---|---|---|---|---|---|---|---|---|---|---|---|---|---|
| 1 | 24 | Rin Kishimoto (JPN) | | V_{5} | D_{1} | V_{3} | V_{4} | V_{5} | D_{3} | 4 | 6 | 0.67 | 21 | 16 | 5 | 2 |
| 2 | 97 | Mitva Chaudhari (IND) | D_{3} | | D_{2} | V_{5} | V_{5} | V_{5} | V_{5} | 4 | 6 | 0.67 | 25 | 23 | 2 | 3 |
| 3 | 7 | Alice Conrad (FRA) | V_{4} | V_{5} | | D_{3} | V_{5} | V_{3} | V_{5} | 5 | 6 | 0.83 | 25 | 14 | 11 | 1 |
| 4 | 85 | Sophia Tweddle (NZL) | D_{1} | D_{3} | V_{4} | | V_{5} | V_{5} | D_{4} | 3 | 6 | 0.50 | 22 | 22 | 0 | 4 |
| 5 | 54 | Lai Hiu Tung (HKG) | D_{3} | D_{4} | D_{2} | D_{4} | | V_{5} | V_{5} | 2 | 6 | 0.33 | 23 | 24 | -1 | 6 |
| 6 | 67 | Imogen Rice (AUS) | D_{1} | D_{2} | D_{2} | D_{2} | D_{4} | | D_{1} | 0 | 6 | 0.00 | 12 | 26 | -14 | 7 |
| 7 | 37 | Vittoria Siletti (ITA) | V_{4} | D_{4} | D_{3} | V_{5} | D_{1} | V_{3} | | 3 | 6 | 0.50 | 20 | 23 | -3 | 5 |

=== Pool 8 ===
| # | Seed | Athlete | 1 | 2 | 3 | 4 | 5 | 6 | 7 | V# | M# | Ind. | TG | TR | Diff. | RP |
|---|---|---|---|---|---|---|---|---|---|---|---|---|---|---|---|---|
| 1 | 53 | Sophie Engdahl (SWE) | | V_{5} | V_{5} | V_{5} | V_{4} | D_{4} | V_{5} | 5 | 6 | 0.83 | 28 | 20 | 8 | 2 |
| 2 | 83 | Yashkeerat Hayer (IND) | D_{4} | | V_{5} | D_{4} | D_{2} | D_{1} | D_{1} | 1 | 6 | 0.17 | 17 | 28 | -11 | 7 |
| 3 | 23 | Anna Vergnes (LTU) | D_{3} | D_{3} | | V_{5} | V_{3} | D_{1} | V_{4} | 3 | 6 | 0.50 | 19 | 22 | -3 | 5 |
| 4 | 38 | Kim Tae-hee (KOR) | D_{2} | V_{5} | D_{2} | | D_{3} | V_{5} | V_{5} | 3 | 6 | 0.50 | 22 | 25 | -3 | 4 |
| 5 | 68 | Pauline Heubi (SUI) | D_{3} | V_{5} | D_{2} | V_{4} | | D_{3} | V_{5} | 3 | 6 | 0.50 | 22 | 19 | 3 | 3 |
| 6 | 8 | Wu Mi-a (TPE) | V_{5} | V_{5} | V_{5} | D_{4} | V_{5} | | V_{5} | 5 | 6 | 0.83 | 29 | 15 | 14 | 1 |
| 7 | 96 | Hiba Hafeez (USA) | D_{3} | V_{5} | D_{3} | D_{3} | D_{2} | D_{1} | | 1 | 6 | 0.17 | 17 | 25 | -8 | 6 |

=== Pool 9 ===
| # | Seed | Athlete | 1 | 2 | 3 | 4 | 5 | 6 | 7 | V# | M# | Ind. | TG | TR | Diff. | RP |
|---|---|---|---|---|---|---|---|---|---|---|---|---|---|---|---|---|
| 1 | 99 | Danah Al-Qassem (KSA) | | D_{0} | D_{3} | D_{2} | D_{4} | D_{2} | D_{0} | 0 | 6 | 0.00 | 11 | 30 | -19 | 7 |
| 2 | 52 | Anna Zens (LUX) | V_{5} | | V_{5} | V_{5} | V_{5} | V_{5} | D_{4} | 5 | 6 | 0.83 | 29 | 20 | 9 | 2 |
| 3 | 69 | Tamsyn Campbell (NZL) | V_{5} | D_{3} | | D_{3} | D_{4} | D_{3} | D_{4} | 1 | 6 | 0.17 | 22 | 28 | -6 | 6 |
| 4 | 9 | Edina Kardos (HUN) | V_{5} | D_{4} | V_{5} | | D_{3} | D_{3} | V_{4} | 3 | 6 | 0.50 | 24 | 23 | 1 | 5 |
| 5 | 82 | Aynur Guliyeva (AZE) | V_{5} | D_{4} | V_{5} | V_{5} | | V_{5} | D_{2} | 4 | 6 | 0.67 | 26 | 24 | 2 | 3 |
| 6 | 39 | Hana Saito (JPN) | V_{5} | D_{4} | V_{5} | V_{5} | D_{3} | | D_{3} | 3 | 6 | 0.50 | 25 | 23 | 2 | 4 |
| 7 | 22 | Outi Jaakkola (FIN) | V_{5} | V_{5} | V_{5} | D_{3} | V_{5} | V_{5} | | 5 | 6 | 0.83 | 28 | 17 | 11 | 1 |

=== Pool 10 ===
| # | Seed | Athlete | 1 | 2 | 3 | 4 | 5 | 6 | 7 | V# | M# | Ind. | TG | TR | Diff. | RP |
|---|---|---|---|---|---|---|---|---|---|---|---|---|---|---|---|---|
| 1 | 40 | Cecylia Cieślik (POL) | | D_{2} | V_{5} | V_{3} | D_{3} | V_{5} | D_{2} | 3 | 6 | 0.50 | 20 | 21 | -1 | 5 |
| 2 | 51 | Martina Torrego (ESP) | V_{4} | | V_{5} | D_{3} | V_{5} | V_{5} | V_{5} | 5 | 6 | 0.83 | 27 | 15 | 12 | 1 |
| 3 | 70 | Natalja Stiller (DEN) | D_{2} | D_{2} | | D_{3} | D_{1} | D_{4} | D_{1} | 0 | 6 | 0.00 | 13 | 30 | -17 | 7 |
| 4 | 10 | Océane Francillonne (FRA) | D_{2} | V_{4} | V_{5} | | V_{5} | V_{5} | D_{1} | 4 | 6 | 0.67 | 22 | 19 | 3 | 4 |
| 5 | 21 | Julia Caron (GBR) | V_{5} | D_{4} | V_{5} | D_{2} | | V_{5} | V_{5} | 4 | 6 | 0.67 | 26 | 20 | 6 | 2 |
| 6 | 81 | Khadija Hasanli (AZE) | D_{3} | D_{2} | V_{5} | D_{3} | D_{4} | | D_{3} | 1 | 6 | 0.17 | 20 | 29 | -9 | 6 |
| 7 | 100 | Eleonora Orso (ITA) | V_{5} | D_{1} | V_{5} | V_{5} | D_{2} | V_{5} | | 4 | 6 | 0.67 | 23 | 17 | 6 | 3 |

=== Pool 11 ===
| # | Seed | Athlete | 1 | 2 | 3 | 4 | 5 | 6 | V# | M# | Ind. | TG | TR | Diff. | RP |
|---|---|---|---|---|---|---|---|---|---|---|---|---|---|---|---|
| 1 | 41 | Francesca Parmesani (SLO) | | V_{5} | D_{3} | V_{5} | D_{4} | V_{5} | 3 | 5 | 0.60 | 22 | 15 | 7 | 1 |
| 2 | 20 | Réka Salamon (HUN) | D_{0} | | D_{3} | V_{5} | V_{5} | V_{5} | 3 | 5 | 0.60 | 18 | 19 | -1 | 4 |
| 3 | 11 | Aube Vandingenen (BEL) | V_{5} | V_{4} | | D_{4} | D_{3} | V_{5} | 3 | 5 | 0.60 | 21 | 19 | 2 | 3 |
| 4 | 80 | Tanuja (IND) | D_{3} | D_{2} | V_{5} | | V_{5} | D_{4} | 2 | 5 | 0.40 | 19 | 21 | -2 | 5 |
| 5 | 50 | Yuri Inayama (JPN) | V_{5} | D_{4} | V_{5} | D_{2} | | V_{5} | 3 | 5 | 0.60 | 21 | 18 | 3 | 2 |
| 6 | 71 | Nada Abed (KSA) | D_{2} | D_{4} | D_{3} | V_{5} | D_{1} | | 1 | 5 | 0.20 | 15 | 24 | -9 | 6 |

=== Pool 12 ===
| # | Seed | Athlete | 1 | 2 | 3 | 4 | 5 | 6 | V# | M# | Ind. | TG | TR | Diff. | RP |
|---|---|---|---|---|---|---|---|---|---|---|---|---|---|---|---|
| 1 | 19 | Aleyna Ertürk (TUR) | | V_{5} | V_{5} | D_{4} | V_{5} | V_{5} | 4 | 5 | 0.80 | 24 | 15 | 9 | 1 |
| 2 | 42 | Gabriela Aigermanová (CZE) | D_{3} | | V_{5} | V_{5} | D_{2} | V_{5} | 3 | 5 | 0.60 | 20 | 16 | 4 | 3 |
| 3 | 72 | Seraphine Cox (NZL) | D_{2} | D_{2} | | D_{3} | D_{4} | V_{5} | 1 | 5 | 0.20 | 16 | 24 | -8 | 5 |
| 4 | 12 | Lena Chevaux (AUT) | V_{5} | D_{2} | V_{5} | | D_{3} | V_{5} | 3 | 5 | 0.60 | 20 | 19 | 1 | 4 |
| 5 | 49 | Chan Tsz Ching (HKG) | D_{4} | V_{5} | V_{5} | V_{4} | | V_{5} | 4 | 5 | 0.80 | 23 | 15 | 8 | 2 |
| 6 | 79 | Monika Men (CAM) | D_{1} | D_{2} | D_{4} | D_{3} | D_{1} | | 0 | 5 | 0.00 | 11 | 25 | -14 | 6 |

=== Pool 13 ===
| # | Seed | Athlete | 1 | 2 | 3 | 4 | 5 | 6 | V# | M# | Ind. | TG | TR | Diff. | RP |
|---|---|---|---|---|---|---|---|---|---|---|---|---|---|---|---|
| 1 | 43 | Kim Na-kyeong (KOR) | | D_{3} | V_{4} | V_{5} | D_{3} | V_{5} | 3 | 5 | 0.60 | 20 | 20 | 0 | 4 |
| 2 | 13 | Polina Khaertdinova (AIN) | V_{5} | | V_{5} | V_{5} | V_{5} | D_{4} | 4 | 5 | 0.80 | 24 | 13 | 11 | 1 |
| 3 | 48 | Daniela Pinyol (ESP) | D_{3} | D_{3} | | D_{4} | D_{1} | D_{3} | 0 | 5 | 0.00 | 14 | 24 | -10 | 6 |
| 4 | 74 | Maria Embrich (EST) | D_{4} | D_{2} | V_{5} | | V_{5} | V_{5} | 3 | 5 | 0.60 | 21 | 21 | 0 | 3 |
| 5 | 77 | Anna Roskosz (POL) | V_{5} | D_{0} | V_{5} | D_{4} | | D_{1} | 2 | 5 | 0.40 | 15 | 19 | -4 | 5 |
| 6 | 18 | Dar Hecht (ISR) | D_{3} | V_{5} | V_{5} | D_{3} | V_{5} | | 3 | 5 | 0.60 | 21 | 18 | 3 | 2 |

=== Pool 14 ===
| # | Seed | Athlete | 1 | 2 | 3 | 4 | 5 | 6 | V# | M# | Ind. | TG | TR | Diff. | RP |
|---|---|---|---|---|---|---|---|---|---|---|---|---|---|---|---|
| 1 | 45 | Oliwia Tercjak (POL) | | D_{3} | V_{5} | D_{1} | D_{3} | V_{5} | 2 | 5 | 0.40 | 17 | 21 | -4 | 4 |
| 2 | 14 | Pia Huber (AUT) | V_{5} | | V_{5} | D_{3} | D_{1} | V_{5} | 3 | 5 | 0.60 | 19 | 18 | 1 | 3 |
| 3 | 78 | Elsie Lins (NZL) | D_{3} | D_{1} | | D_{2} | D_{3} | V_{5} | 1 | 5 | 0.20 | 14 | 24 | -10 | 6 |
| 4 | 44 | Adél Büki (HUN) | V_{5} | V_{5} | V_{5} | | V_{4} | V_{5} | 5 | 5 | 1.00 | 24 | 13 | 11 | 1 |
| 5 | 17 | Emma Lauvray (FRA) | V_{4} | V_{5} | V_{5} | D_{3} | | D_{2} | 3 | 5 | 0.60 | 19 | 16 | 3 | 2 |
| 6 | 73 | Galina Krymova (AIN) | D_{4} | D_{4} | D_{4} | D_{4} | V_{5} | | 1 | 5 | 0.20 | 21 | 22 | -1 | 5 |

=== Pool 15 ===
| # | Seed | Athlete | 1 | 2 | 3 | 4 | 5 | 6 | V# | M# | Ind. | TG | TR | Diff. | RP |
|---|---|---|---|---|---|---|---|---|---|---|---|---|---|---|---|
| 1 | 76 | Eli Mlekuž (SLO) | | D_{3} | D_{4} | D_{2} | D_{2} | D_{4} | 0 | 5 | 0.00 | 15 | 25 | -10 | 6 |
| 2 | 47 | Luise Ziegler (GER) | V_{5} | | V_{5} | V_{5} | V_{3} | V_{5} | 5 | 5 | 1.00 | 23 | 12 | 11 | 1 |
| 3 | 75 | Mumtaj (IND) | V_{5} | D_{3} | | D_{0} | D_{3} | D_{2} | 1 | 5 | 0.20 | 13 | 24 | -11 | 5 |
| 4 | 16 | Zofia Janelli (POL) | V_{5} | D_{3} | V_{5} | | V_{4} | V_{5} | 4 | 5 | 0.80 | 22 | 12 | 10 | 2 |
| 5 | 15 | Virginia Romeo (SUI) | V_{5} | D_{2} | V_{5} | D_{3} | | V_{5} | 3 | 5 | 0.60 | 20 | 15 | 5 | 3 |
| 6 | 46 | Marlena Jawaid (SWE) | V_{5} | D_{1} | V_{5} | D_{2} | D_{3} | | 2 | 5 | 0.40 | 16 | 21 | -5 | 4 |

== Results bracket ==
Fencers are placed into a single-elimination tournament bracket based on their pool phase ranking. Knockout matches are contested to 15 touches. The bout is divided into three 3-minute rounds, with a 1-minute rest period between rounds. A loss results in immediate elimination from the tournament. The competition progresses until the final match determines the gold medalist. Both losing semifinalists receive bronze medals, meaning no third-place playoff is held.

=== Section 1 ===
Table of 128
64 | Tanuja (IND) | 10
65 | I Izzo (SUI) | 15
73 | N Gebala (USA) | 12
56 | C Watrall (USA) | 15
57 | L Mironov (EST) | 15
72 | V Tengesdal (NOR) | 11

Table of 64
1 | A Zittel (GER) | 12
64 | I Izzo (SUI) | 11
33 | H Hillier (GBR) | 6
32 | M Chaudhari (IND) | 15
17 | A Maksymenko (UKR) | 15
47T | L Goldmann (GER) | 10
49 | P Heubi (SUI) | 10
16 | L Löhr (GER) | 11
9 | M Torrego (ESP) | 15
56 | C Watrall (USA) | 12
41 | A Vandingenen (BEL) | 15
24 | J Caron (GBR) | 13
25 | E Orso (ITA) | 14
40 | E Lauvray (FRA) | 10
57 | L Mironov (EST) | 13
8 | M Homma (JPN) | 15

Table of 32
1 | A Zittel (GER) | 15
32 | M Chaudhari (IND) | 11
17 | A Maksymenko (UKR) | 15
16 | L Löhr (GER) | 12
9 | M Torrego (ESP) | 5
41 | A Vandingenen (BEL) | 15
25 | E Orso (ITA) | 10
8 | M Homma (JPN) | 15

Table of 16
1 | A Zittel (GER) | 9
17 | A Maksymenko (UKR) | 15
41 | A Vandingenen (BEL) | 15
8 | M Homma (JPN) | 5

Quarterfinals
17 | A Maksymenko (UKR) | 15
41 | A Vandingenen (BEL) | 13

=== Section 2 ===
Table of 128
69 | H Hafeez (USA) | 15
60 | C Cieślik (POL) | 12
61 | Kim Th (KOR) | 15
68 | M Jawaid (SWE) | 8

Table of 64
5 | E Fransson (SWE) | 15
69 | H Hafeez (USA) | 7
37 | G Aigermanová (CZE) | 13
28 | R Kishimoto (JPN) | 15
21 | Chan TC (HKG) | 11
44 | M Embrich (EST) | 15
53 | E Kardos (HUN) | 15
12 | A Conrad (FRA) | 5
13 | Lim Th (KOR) | 15
52 | A Yee (AUS) | 8
45 | Kim Nk (KOR) | 7
20 | A Ertürk (TUR) | 15
29 | K Dyner (CRC) | 10
36 | V Romeo (SUI) | 15
61 | Kim Th (KOR) | 9
4 | L Ziegler (GER) | 8

Table of 32
5 | E Fransson (SWE) | 15
28 | R Kishimoto (JPN) | 7
44 | M Embrich (EST) | 12
53 | E Kardos (HUN) | 15
13 | Lim Th (KOR) | 15
20 | A Ertürk (TUR) | 11
36 | V Romeo (SUI) | 13
61 | Kim Th (KOR) | 9

Table of 16
5 | E Fransson (SWE) | 12
53 | E Kardos (HUN) | 13
13 | Lim Th (KOR) | 15
36 | V Romeo (SUI) | 10

Quarterfinals
53 | E Kardos (HUN) | 13
13 | Lim Th (KOR) | 12

=== Section 3 ===
Table of 128
67 | A Roskosz (POL) | 15
62 | V Siletti (ITA) | 8
59 | S Sidenko (UKR) | 9
70 | Lai HT (HKG) | 15

Table of 64
3 | A Büki (HUN) | 15
67 | A Roskosz (POL) | 9
35 | F Parmesani (SLO) | 6
30 | O Francillonne (FRA) | 12
19 | Z Janelli (POL) | 11
46 | R Salamon (HUN) | 15
51 | E Ferracuti (ITA) | 15
14 | A Zens (LUX) | 7
11 | Y Yizhaki (ISR) | 15
54T | P Kuleshova (UKR) | 12
43 | P Huber (AUT) | 11
22 | C Maccagno (ITA) | 15
27 | E Conrad (UKR) | 15
38T | D Hecht (ISR) | 11
70 | Lai HT (HKG) | 14
6 | Wu Ma (TPE) | 15

Table of 32
3 | A Büki (HUN) | 6
30 | O Francillonne (FRA) | 15
46 | R Salamon (HUN) | 9
51 | E Ferracuti (ITA) | 15
11 | Y Yizhaki (ISR) | 12
22 | C Maccagno (ITA) | 11
27 | E Conrad (UKR) | 15
6 | Wu Ma (TPE) | 10

Table of 16
30 | O Francillonne (FRA) | 15
51 | E Ferracuti (ITA) | 4
22 | C Maccagno (ITA) | 11
27 | E Conrad (UKR) | 14

Quarterfinals
30 | O Francillonne (FRA) | 7
27 | E Conrad (UKR) | 15

=== Section 4 ===
Table of 128
71 | D Wimmer (HUN) | 15
58 | S Tweddle (NZL) | 4
63 | A Vergnes (LTU) | 11
66 | O Tercjak (POL) | 15

Table of 64
7 | K Hsieh (HKG) | 14
71 | D Wimmer (HUN) | 11
38T | Y Inayama (JPN) | 15
26 | P Prokšíková (CZE) | 5
23 | C Lozano (ESP) | 10
42 | L Chevaux (AUT) | 15
54T | Park Hb (KOR) | 9
10 | O Jaakkola (FIN) | 15
15 | S Engdahl (SWE) | 11
50 | H Saito (JPN) | 12
47T | N Rahimova (AZE) | 13
18 | P Khaertdinova (AIN) | 15
31 | A Guliyeva (AZE) | 12
34 | A Bultynck (BEL) | 15
66 | O Tercjak (POL) | 11
2 | T Larkina (AIN) | 15

Table of 32
7 | K Hsieh (HKG) | 15
38T | Y Inayama (JPN) | 10
42 | L Chevaux (AUT) | 15
10 | O Jaakkola (FIN) | 13
50 | H Saito (JPN) | 15
18 | P Khaertdinova (AIN) | 14
34 | A Bultynck (BEL) | 13
2 | T Larkina (AIN) | 14

Table of 16
7 | K Hsieh (HKG) | 15
42 | L Chevaux (AUT) | 8
50 | H Saito (JPN) | 4
2 | T Larkina (AIN) | 15

Quarterfinals
7 | K Hsieh (HKG) | 12
2 | T Larkina (AIN) | 11

=== Finals ===
Quarterfinals
17 | A Maksymenko (UKR) | 15
41 | A Vandingenen (BEL) | 13
53 | E Kardos (HUN) | 13
13 | Lim Th (KOR) | 12
30 | O Francillonne (FRA) | 7
27 | E Conrad (UKR) | 15
7 | K Hsieh (HKG) | 12
2 | T Larkina (AIN) | 11

Semifinals
17 | A Maksymenko (UKR) | 15
53 | E Kardos (HUN) | 12
27 | E Conrad (UKR) | 8
7 | K Hsieh (HKG) | 10

Final
17 | A Maksymenko (UKR) | 8
7 | K Hsieh (HKG) | 9
