= Fencing at the 2025 Summer World University Games – Men's team épée =

Men's team épée at the 2025 Summer World University Games
- Venue: Messe Essen
- Location: Essen
- Dates: 21 July
- Nations: 26

Medalists
gold medal	Seiya Asami; Ryu Matsumoto; Naoshi Nakamoto; Hidemasa Sakato	Japan
silver medal	Ádám Keresztes; Gergely Kovács; Maruan Osman-Touson; Soma Somody	Hungary
bronze medal	Fabrizio Cuomo; Nicolò Del Contrasto; Fabrizio Di Marco; Simone Mencarelli	Italy

The men's team épée at the 2025 Summer World University Games in Rhine-Ruhr, Germany was held 21 July 2025. Japan won the gold medal. The Japanese team consisted of Seiya Asami, Ryu Matsumoto, Naoshi Nakamoto and Hidemasa Sakato. They defeated Hungary in the final match with a close score of 45-44. Hungary took the silver medal, and Italy secured the bronze medal.

== Results bracket ==
The tournament was played as a single-elimination bracket. Teams that lost were eliminated from gold medal contention, while winners advanced through the table (Table of 32, 16, Quarterfinals, Semifinals, and Finals). The two teams that lost in the semifinal round faced each other in a separate match to determine the bronze medal winner.

Table of 32
17	Sweden	30
16	Netherlands	45
9	Poland	45
24	India	33
25	Australia	24
8	Ukraine	45
21	Chinese Taipei	35
12	Estonia	45
13	Spain	45
20	Slovenia	22
19	Saudi Arabia	44
14	Great Britain	43
11	France	45
22	Norway	23
7	Switzerland	45
26	New Zealand	21
23	Mongolia	24
10	United States	45
15	Germany	38
18	South Africa	45

Table of 16
1	Japan	45
16	Netherlands	25
9	Poland	38
8	Ukraine	45
5	Italy	41
12	Estonia	40
13	Spain	38
4	Individual Neutral Athletes	45
3	South Korea	40
19	Saudi Arabia	41
11	France	45
6	Kazakhstan	42
7	Switzerland	45
10	United States	32
18	South Africa	32
2	Hungary	45

Quarterfinals
1	Japan	45
8	Ukraine	39
5	Italy	45
4	Individual Neutral Athletes	37
19	Saudi Arabia	31
11	France	45
7	Switzerland	40
2	Hungary	45

Semifinals
1	Japan	45
5	Italy	38
11	France	31
2	Hungary	45

Final
1	Japan	45
2	Hungary	44
Third place
5	Italy	45
11	France	34
