= 2024 European Cadets and Juniors Fencing Championships =

Fencing competition held in Naples, Italy

- Dates: 22–29 February 2024

The 2024 European Cadets and Juniors Fencing Championships were held in Naples, Italy from 22 to 29 February 2024. The event featured individual and team competitions across all three weapons — épée, foil, and sabre — for both sexes in both cadet (U17) and junior (U20) categories. It was organized under the auspices of the European Fencing Confederation (EFC) and hosted at the Mostra d'Oltremare exhibition center.

== Background ==
The European Cadets and Juniors Championships serve as a key developmental milestone for young fencers across Europe. Many participants go on to compete at senior European Championships and Olympic Games. Naples was selected as the host city due to its strong fencing tradition and infrastructure, with the Mostra d'Oltremare providing a multi-piste venue suitable for large-scale international events.

== Schedule ==
The competition was divided into two segments:

- Cadets: 22–25 February 2024
- Juniors: 26–29 February 2024

The opening ceremony took place on 22 February at 18:30 local time.

== Participating nations ==
Over 40 national federations affiliated with the EFC sent delegations to the championships. Each country was allowed to enter up to four athletes per individual event and one team per weapon category. Fencers from Russia and Belarus were able to enter as individual neutral athletes.

== Notable performances ==
Several athletes distinguished themselves with double podium finishes in both individual and team events. The Italian delegation topped the overall medal table, continuing their dominance in youth fencing.

== Cadet Championships ==
Event	Gold	Silver	Bronze
Women
Epée	Anna Maksymenko; Ukraine	Lucia Abajo Salcedo; Spain	Julia Trynova; Estonia
Epée	Anna Maksymenko; Ukraine	Lucia Abajo Salcedo; Spain	Silvia Gomez Lopez; Spain
Team epée	Ukraine; Emili Conrad; Anna Maksymenko; Alina Dmytruk; Mariia Sereda	Poland; Alicja Goczal; Oliwia Janeczek; Laura Misiak; Magda Ratyna	Estonia; Eliisa Kikerpill; Aleksandra Nikolajeva; Ksenja Parlin; Julia Trynova
Foil	Anna Kollar; Hungary	Mariavittoria Berretta; Italy	Natasza Kus; Poland
Foil	Anna Kollar; Hungary	Mariavittoria Berretta; Italy	Adeline Senic; Moldova
Team foil	Poland; Michalina Bartol; Natasza Kus; Aleksandra Nowakowska; Hanna Wojtas	Italy; Mariavittoria Elvira Berretta; Maria Elisa Fattori; Ludovica Franzoni; Vittoria Riva	Ukraine; Ahlaia Borysova; Svitlana Bryzgalova; Anna Shcherba; Milana Stepovyk
Sabre	Vittoria Mocci; Italy	Dorottya Csonka; Hungary	Alexandra Kuvaeva; Georgia
Sabre	Vittoria Mocci; Italy	Dorottya Csonka; Hungary	Francesca Lentini; Italy
Team sabre	Italy; Francesca Lentini; Benedetta Stangoni; Diletta Fusetti; Vittoria Mocci	Hungary; Nadin Toth; Brigitta Racz; Polli Szabo; Dorottya Csonka	Ukraine; Valeriia Shchepkina; Viktoria Korotchenko; Anna Suvorova; Maiia Velychko
Men
Epée	Michele Queiroli; Italy	Sameer Sunder Rajan; Great Britain	Theo Mitrail; France
Epée	Michele Queiroli; Italy	Sameer Sunder Rajan; Great Britain	Doruk Erolcevik; Turkey
Team epée	Ukraine; Maksym Mykytenko; Myron Durnevych; Mark Stasovskyi; Maksym Gula	Turkey; Doruk Erolcevik; Mert Ahmet Koc; Goksu Mert Oran; Alaz Guney Karakas	Switzerland; Juliano Nicola Squieri; Aurelien Favre; Gianluca Wicht; Maurice Staeheli
Foil	Lauro Falchetto; Austria	Mattia Conticini; Italy	David Kelly; Great Britain
Foil	Lauro Falchetto; Austria	Mattia Conticini; Italy	Marco Panazzolo; Italy
Team foil	Israel; Evyatar Koren; Eitan Lemberger; Ilay Soriano; Ran Traitel Crystal	France; Boumaza Mahel; Gaven Mary Thibault; Parpeyrat Fournel Ulisse; Watson Guillaume	Italy; Marco Panazzolo; Emanuele Iaquinta; Elia Pasin; Mattia Conticini
Sabre	Leonardo Reale; Italy	Furkan Yaman; Turkey	Roman Fraboulet; France
Sabre	Leonardo Reale; Italy	Furkan Yaman; Turkey	Marco Panazzolo; Italy
Team sabre	Italy; Valerio Reale; Leonardo Reale; Christian Murtas; Massimo Sibillo	Bulgaria; Simeon Dalekov; Nikola Gospodinov; Nikolay-Tomas Georgiev; Nikola Meicov	Hungary; Lorinc Kovacs; Akos Fabo; Daniel Berkeszi; Botond Csoba

== Junior championships ==
Event	Gold	Silver	Bronze
Women
Epée	Anna Maksymenko; Ukraine	Emily Conrad; Ukraine	Sofija Prosina; Latvia
Epée	Anna Maksymenko; Ukraine	Emily Conrad; Ukraine	Eleonora Orso; Italy
Team epée	Ukraine; Emily Conrad; Alina Dmytruk; Anna Maksymenko; Oleksandra Romanova	France; Anaelle Doquet; Oceane Francillonne; Thais Naucelle Jardell; Garance Palpacuer	Hungary; Greta Gachalyi; Blanka Virag Nagy; Reka Salamon; Dorina Wimmer
Foil	Carolina Stutchbury; Great Britain	Polina Volobueva; Neutral Athlete	Garance Roger; France
Foil	Carolina Stutchbury; Great Britain	Polina Volobueva; Neutral Athlete	Matilde Molinari; Italy
Team foil	France; Alicia Audibert; Keren Aye; Pauline Le Chanjour; Garance Roger	Hungary; Luca Kalocsai; Anna Kollar; Petra Polonyi; Eszter Wolf	Poland; Marta Jakubowska; Natasza Kus; Amelia Olszewska; Karolina Zurawska
Sabre	Emma Neikova; Bulgaria	Anna Spiesz; Hungary	Felice Herbon; Germany
Sabre	Emma Neikova; Bulgaria	Anna Spiesz; Hungary	Amalia Covaliu; Romania
Team sabre	Hungary; Emese Domonkos; Csenge Konya; Zsanett Kovacs; Anna Spiesz	France; Roxane Chabrol; Alejandra Manga; Aurore Patrice; Toscane Tori	Italy; Alessandra Nicolai; Maria Clementina Polli; Manuela Spica; Mariella Viale
Men
Epée	Dov Ber Vilensky; Israel	Colin Mumenthaler; Switzerland	Matthew Buelau; Germany
Epée	Dov Ber Vilensky; Israel	Colin Mumenthaler; Switzerland	Artem Sarkisyan; Individual Neutral Athletes
Team epée	Italy; Nicolo del Contrasto; Matteo Galassi; Fabio Mastromarino; Jacopo Rizzi	Germany; Matthew Buelau; Ole Petersen; Julius Ruppenthal; Jakob Stange	Israel; Fedor Khaperskiy; Yehonathan Lambrey Messika; Alon Sarid; Dov Ber Vilensky
Foil	Matteo Iacomoni; Italy	Eliot Chagnon; France	Oscar Geudvert; Belgium
Foil	Matteo Iacomoni; Italy	Eliot Chagnon; France	Alexey Ivanov; Individual Neutral Athletes
Team foil	Italy; Mattia De Cristofaro; Federico Greganti; Matteo Iacomoni; Gregorio Isolani	France; Anas Anane; Eliot Chagnon; Adrien Helmy-Cocoynacq; Louis Pradel	Hungary; Albert Bagdany; Almos Balint; Ambrus Budahazy; Mattia Rubin
Sabre	Remi Garrigue; France	Edoardo Cantini; Italy	Benedek Vigh; Hungary
Sabre	Remi Garrigue; France	Edoardo Cantini; Italy	Santiago Madrigal; Spain
Team sabre	Romania; Casian Cidu; Vlad Covaliu; Mihnea Enache; Radu Nitu	France; Tom Couderc; Benjamin Ducerf; Remi Garrigue; Axel Pogu	Spain; Jorge Casaus Pielago; Jaime Florez; Santiago Madrigal; Asier Olangua

== Medal table ==
* Host nation (Italy)

Rank	Nation	Gold	Silver	Bronze	Total
1	Italy (ITA)*	8	4	7	19
2	Ukraine (UKR)	5	1	2	8
3	France (FRA)	2	6	3	11
4	Hungary (HUN)	2	4	4	10
5	Israel (ISR)	2	0	1	3
6	Poland (POL)	1	1	2	4
7	Great Britain (GBR)	1	1	1	3
8	Bulgaria (BUL)	1	1	0	2
9	Romania (ROU)	1	0	1	2
10	Austria (AUT)	1	0	0	1
11	Turkiye	0	2	1	3
12	Spain (ESP)	0	1	3	4
13	Germany (GER)	0	1	2	3
–	neutral athletes	0	1	2	3
14	Switzerland (SUI)	0	1	1	2
15	Estonia (EST)	0	0	2	2
16	Belgium (BEL)	0	0	1	1
16	Georgia (GEO)	0	0	1	1
16	Latvia (LAT)	0	0	1	1
16	Moldova (MDA)	0	0	1	1
Totals (19 entries)		24	24	36	84

== Officials and organization ==
The event was overseen by Jon Willis, President of the Directoire Technique, and Georgina Usher, EFC Event Safeguarding Officer. Referees and medical staff were appointed by the EFC, and the British delegation included a full coaching and support team.
