= 2023 Junior and Cadet Fencing World Championships =

International fencing competition in Bulgaria

- Dates: 1–9 April
- Host city: Plovdiv, Bulgaria
- Venue: Plovdiv International Fair
- Events: 18

The 2023 Junior and Cadet Fencing World Championships took place from 1 to 9 April 2023 in Plovdiv, Bulgaria.

Due to the ongoing Russian invasion of Ukraine, fencers from Russia and Belarus were banned from competing.

== Medal table ==
* Host nation (Bulgaria)

Rank	Nation	Gold	Silver	Bronze	Total
1	United States	8	2	5	15
2	Hungary	4	0	5	9
3	Egypt	2	1	2	5
4	Italy	1	4	2	7
5	Poland	1	2	0	3
6	China	1	1	2	4
7	Great Britain	1	0	0	1
8	Japan	0	3	2	5
9	Switzerland	0	2	0	2
10	Azerbaijan	0	1	0	1
10	South Korea	0	1	0	1
10	U.S. Virgin Islands	0	1	0	1
13	Canada	0	0	2	2
14	Bulgaria*	0	0	1	1
14	Chinese Taipei	0	0	1	1
14	France	0	0	1	1
14	Hong Kong	0	0	1	1
14	Israel	0	0	1	1
14	Romania	0	0	1	1
14	Spain	0	0	1	1
14	Turkey	0	0	1	1
14	Ukraine	0	0	1	1
14	Uzbekistan	0	0	1	1
Totals (23 entries)		18	18	30	66

== Medals summary ==
=== Junior ===
==== Men ====
Event	Gold	Silver	Bronze
Épée Individual	Mohamed Yasseen; Egypt	Théo Brochard; Switzerland	Samuel Imrek; United States
Épée Individual	Mohamed Yasseen; Egypt	Théo Brochard; Switzerland	Soma Somody; Hungary
Épée Team	Egypt; Mohamed Elsayed; Mahmoud Elsayed; Youssef Shamel; Mohamed Yasseen	Switzerland; Alban Aebersold; Théo Brochard; Aurele Favre; Sven Vineis	Hungary; Mate Csabai; Gergely Kovacs; Viktor Kulcsar; Soma Somody
Foil Individual	Damiano Di Veroli; Italy	Zeng Zhaoran; China	Samarth Kumbla; United States
Foil Individual	Damiano Di Veroli; Italy	Zeng Zhaoran; China	Gergő Szemes; Hungary
Foil Team	United States; Andrew Chen; Samarth Kumbla; Brandon Li; Daniel Zhang	Italy; Raian Adoul; Damiano Di Veroli; Giuseppe Franzoni; Matteo Morini	Japan; Ryosuke Fukuda; Shoei Hashimoto; Kazuki Iimura; Toi Takahashi
Sabre Individual	Colin Heathcock; United States	Mao Kokubo; Japan	Emanuele Nardella; Italy
Sabre Individual	Colin Heathcock; United States	Mao Kokubo; Japan	Shido Tsumori; Japan
Sabre Team	United States; Lev Ben Avram; Colin Heathcock; Cody Walter Ji; William Morrill	Egypt; Ahmed Hesham; Yassin Khodir; Adham Moataz; Zeyad Nofal	Romania; Casian Cîdu; Vlad Covaliu; Mihnea Enache; Radu Nițu

==== Women ====
Event	Gold	Silver	Bronze
Épée Individual	Hadley Husisian; United States	Alicja Klasik; Poland	Anna Maksymenko; Ukraine
Épée Individual	Hadley Husisian; United States	Alicja Klasik; Poland	Nicole Feygin; Israel
Épée Team	Poland; Cecylia Cieslik; Alicja Klasik; Gloria Klughardt; Kinga Zgryzniak	United States; Hadley Husisian; Ketki Ketkar; Tierna Oxenreider; Faith Park	China; Shi Ziyan; Tang Junyao; Xie Yuchen; Yang Dong
Foil Individual	Zander Rhodes; United States	Lauren Scruggs; United States	Aurora Grandis; Italy
Foil Individual	Zander Rhodes; United States	Lauren Scruggs; United States	Yunjia Zhang; Canada
Foil Team	United States; Emily Jing; Ryanne Leslie; Zander Rhodes; Lauren Scruggs	Italy; Giulia Amore; Matilde Calvanese; Carlotta Ferrari; Aurora Grandis	China; Song Yue; Tong Mixue; Zhang Ruping; Zhuang Xinyi
Sabre Individual	Magda Skarbonkiewicz; United States	Yuina Kaneko; Japan	Nisanur Erbil; Turkey
Sabre Individual	Magda Skarbonkiewicz; United States	Yuina Kaneko; Japan	Anna Spiesz; Hungary
Sabre Team	Hungary; Sugár Katinka Battai; Dorottya Beviz; Kira Keszei; Anna Spiesz	Italy; Carlotta Fusetti; Michela Landi; Maria Clementina Polli; Manuela Spica	Bulgaria; Kalina Atanasova; Beloslava Ivanova; Ana Mihailova; Emma Neikova

=== Cadet ===
==== Men ====
Event	Gold	Silver	Bronze
Épée	Domonkos Pelle; Hungary	Kruz Schembri; U.S. Virgin Islands	Rayan Rami Rozpide; Spain
Épée	Domonkos Pelle; Hungary	Kruz Schembri; U.S. Virgin Islands	Noam Duchene; France
Foil	Guo Yifan; China	Choi Hyeok-jun; South Korea	Abdelrahman Tolba; Egypt
Foil	Guo Yifan; China	Choi Hyeok-jun; South Korea	Mattia Rubin; Hungary
Sabre	William Morrill; United States	Benedykt Denkiewicz; Poland	Ahmed Hesham; Egypt
Sabre	William Morrill; United States	Benedykt Denkiewicz; Poland	Taylor Chon; United States

==== Women ====
Event	Gold	Silver	Bronze
Épée	Blanka Virag Nagy; Hungary	Mizuki Homma; Japan	Nicole Xuan; Canada
Épée	Blanka Virag Nagy; Hungary	Mizuki Homma; Japan	Li-hsiang Hung; Chinese Taipei
Foil	Amelie Tsang; Great Britain	Greta Collini; Italy	Emily Jing; United States
Foil	Amelie Tsang; Great Britain	Greta Collini; Italy	Shun Yat Wong; Hong Kong
Sabre	Emese Domonkos; Hungary	Zarifa Huseynova; Azerbaijan	Jenna Shoman; United States
Sabre	Emese Domonkos; Hungary	Zarifa Huseynova; Azerbaijan	Nargiza Jaksybaeva; Uzbekistan

== See also ==
- 2023 European Cadets and Juniors Fencing Championships
- 2023 Asian Cadets and Juniors Fencing Championships
