= 2026 European Cadets and Juniors Fencing Championships =

Fencing competition

- Dates: 20–27 February 2026
- Organiser: European Fencing Confederation

The 2026 European Fencing Cadet and Junior Championships were held from 20 February to 27 February 2026 in Tbilisi, Georgia. The event was organized by the European Fencing Confederation (EFC).

== Schedule ==
The competition was divided into cadet and junior events:

- Cadet events: 20–23 February 2026
- Junior events: 24–27 February 2026

== Medal summary ==
=== Medal table ===
* Host nation (Georgia)

| Rank | Nation | Gold | Silver | Bronze | Total |
|---|---|---|---|---|---|
| 1 | Italy | 5 | 6 | 4 | 15 |
| 2 | France | 5 | 2 | 7 | 14 |
| 3 | Russia | 3 | 1 | 4 | 8 |
| 4 | Israel | 2 | 2 | 2 | 6 |
| 5 | Turkey | 2 | 2 | 1 | 5 |
| 6 | Hungary | 2 | 1 | 4 | 7 |
| 7 | Ukraine | 1 | 3 | 1 | 5 |
| 8 | Poland | 1 | 2 | 2 | 5 |
| 9 | Great Britain | 1 | 1 | 3 | 5 |
| 10 | Latvia | 1 | 0 | 1 | 2 |
| 11 | Georgia* | 1 | 0 | 0 | 1 |
| 12 | Romania | 0 | 2 | 0 | 2 |
| 13 | Bulgaria | 0 | 1 | 0 | 1 |
| 13 | Czech Republic | 0 | 1 | 0 | 1 |
| 15 | Germany | 0 | 0 | 3 | 3 |
| 16 | Estonia | 0 | 0 | 2 | 2 |
| 17 | Greece | 0 | 0 | 1 | 1 |
| 17 | Spain | 0 | 0 | 1 | 1 |
| Totals (18 entries) | | 24 | 24 | 36 | 84 |

=== Cadet championships ===
Cadet championships are for fencers under the age of 17.

| Event | Gold | Silver | Bronze |
Men
| Épée | Hiroaki Toto; France | Pietro de Gaetano; Italy | Patrik Dékány; Hungary |
| Épée | Hiroaki Toto; France | Pietro de Gaetano; Italy | Mordechai Milu Lachman; Israel |
| Team épée | France; Loan Chapoulie; Alban Le May; Lucien Leblanc-Morel; Hiroaki Toto | Israel; Lev Botvinnik; Eitan Efraim Charmatski; Yehoda Cohen Gilad; Mordechai Milu Lachman | Italy; Andrea Bossalini; Pietro de Gaetano; Gabriele Giovita; Valentino Monaco |
| Foil | Mahel Boumaza; France | Giovanni Pierucci; Italy | Yi Xing Gao; Spain |
| Foil | Mahel Boumaza; France | Giovanni Pierucci; Italy | Lucas Robinet; France |
| Team foil | France; Mahel Boumaza; Constantin Chino; Victor Lezinska; Lucas Robinet | Italy; Giuseppe Di Martino; Luca Guidi; Riccardo Mancini; Giovanni Pierucci | Poland; Aleksander Bak; Olgierd Borkowski; Szymon Głuszak; Feliks Wisnik |
| Sabre | Giorgi Urushadze; Georgia | Candeniz Berrak; Turkey | Vilmos Godó; Hungary |
| Sabre | Giorgi Urushadze; Georgia | Candeniz Berrak; Turkey | Pietro Hirsch Butté; Italy |
| Team sabre | Italy; Christian Avaltroni; Pietro Hirsch Butté; Jacopo Sciullo; Tommaso Tallarico | Bulgaria; Konstantin Atanasov; Deyan Gospodinov; Nikola Ivanov; Nikola Meitsov | Greece; Michael Koumparos; Evangelos Vasileios Koutlas; Nikolaos Livanos; Angelos Ntivis |
Women
| Épée | Emily Chtefanov; Israel | Adéla Bartošková; Czech Republic | Elizaveta Gorbachuk; Ukraine |
| Épée | Emily Chtefanov; Israel | Adéla Bartošková; Czech Republic | Viktoria Nikiforov; Germany |
| Team épée | Poland; Zofia Białecka; Maria Ciszczon; Lena Furman; Jagoda Tercjak | Ukraine; Marharyta Anharska; Alina Dmytruk; Elizaveta Gorbachuk; Polina Spyrydonova | France; Faustine Gaspard; Loue Charlotte; Appoline Mugnier; Laura Vergés |
| Foil | Alara Atmaca; Turkey | Alexandra Adoch; Romania | Liene Ābele; Latvia |
| Foil | Alara Atmaca; Turkey | Alexandra Adoch; Romania | Melisande Bolore; France |
| Team foil | Italy; Maria Elisa Fattori; Martina Molteni; Gloria Pasqualino; Elena Picchi | Poland; Alicja Gatzl; Teresa Mos; Olga Pisarewicz; Danuta Tym | France; Melisande Bolore; Lilou Gaillardot; Eloise Goutenegre; Pauline Mazille |
| Sabre | Boglárka Komjáthy; Hungary | Maiia Velychko; Ukraine | Anna Torre; Italy |
| Sabre | Boglárka Komjáthy; Hungary | Maiia Velychko; Ukraine | Vittoria Mocci; Italy |
| Team sabre | Italy; Vittoria Fusetti; Vittoria Mocci; Matilde Reale; Anna Torre | Turkey; Elif Çınar Koçak; Berra Kürek; Defne Salman; Irmak Şenoğlu | Germany; Mirja-Lena Haack; Luisa Rezi; Ruoshui Su; Viktoria Voyotova |

=== Junior championships ===
Junior championships are for fenders under the age of 20.

| Event | Gold | Silver | Bronze |
Men
| Épée | Fedor Khaperskiy; Israel | Noam Duchene; France | Tristan Lumineau; Great Britain |
| Épée | Fedor Khaperskiy; Israel | Noam Duchene; France | Roman Selyutin; Russia |
| Team épée | France; Odinn Bindas; Noam Duchene; Théo Mitrail; Aina Rahamefy | Italy; Riccardo Cedrone; Luca Iogna Prat; Ettore Leporati; Cristiano Sena | Israel; Eitan Efraim Charmatski; Fedor Khaperskiy; Mordechai Milu Lachman; Alon Sarid |
| Foil | David Sosnov; Great Britain | Mohammed Belbouab; Great Britain | Henrik Barby; Germany |
| Foil | David Sosnov; Great Britain | Mohammed Belbouab; Great Britain | Dmitrii Chashchin; Russia |
| Team foil | Italy; Mattia Conticini; Mattia De Cristofaro; Emanuele Iaquinta; Fernando Scalora | France; Zakariya Anane; Maxime Dubreuil; Lucas Robinet; Guillaume Watson | Great Britain; Mohammed Belbouab; David Kelly; Callum Penman; David Sosnov |
| Sabre | Furkan Yaman; Turkey | Iaroslav Borisov; Russia | Paul Rouvière; France |
| Sabre | Furkan Yaman; Turkey | Iaroslav Borisov; Russia | Oszkár Vajda; Hungary |
| Team sabre | Russia; Iaroslav Borisov; Pavel Graudyn; Kiam Iarullin; Ivan Novikov | Italy; Antonio Aruta; Edoardo Reale; Leonardo Reale; Valerio Reale | France; Michel Choueiry; Tom Couderc; Paul Rouvière; Maximilien Tori |
Women
| Épée | Sofija Prošina; Latvia | Anna Maksymenko; Ukraine | Oliwia Janeczek; Poland |
| Épée | Sofija Prošina; Latvia | Anna Maksymenko; Ukraine | Julia Trynova; Estonia |
| Team épée | Ukraine; Emily Conrad; Alina Dmytruk; Anna Maksymenko; Mariia Sereda | Hungary; Gréta Gachályi; Lotti Horváth; Laura Éva Kozma; Blanka Virág Nagy | Estonia; Dinara Anis; Eliisa Kikerpill; Aleksandra Nikolajeva; Julia Trynova |
| Foil | Greta Collini; Italy | Ludovica Franzoni; Italy | Alara Atmaca; Turkey |
| Foil | Greta Collini; Italy | Ludovica Franzoni; Italy | Amelie Tsang; Great Britain |
| Team foil | Hungary; Anna Kollár; Jázmin Papp; Petra Polónyi; Xinyao Zhou | Israel; May Kagan Tyagunov; Lihy Peer Koren; Gili Kuritzky; Shahar Saban | Russia; Stefania Chasovnikova; Nelli Kudentcova; Milana Levchuk; Irina Zorina |
| Sabre | Karina Tallada; Russia | Amalia Covaliu; Romania | Aleksandra Mikhailova; Russia |
| Sabre | Karina Tallada; Russia | Amalia Covaliu; Romania | Emese Domonkos; Hungary |
| Team sabre | Russia; Malena Kunasheva; Aleksandra Mikhailova; Karina Tallada; Mariia Tretiakova | Poland; Karolina Hofman; Amelia Siwek; Ewa Wasilewska; Gabriela Wójcik | France; Mathilde Babando; Aurore Patrice; Rita Robineaux; Carmen Wullus |
