= Emily Jing =

American fencer (born 2007)

Personal information
- Born: May 13, 2007 (age 19)
- Home town: Boston, Massachusetts, U.S.

Fencing career
- Sport: Fencing
- Country: United States
- Weapon: Foil
- Hand: Right-handed
Medal record
Women's foil
Representing the United States
World Championships
Gold medal – first place	2025 Tbilisi	Team
Pan American Championships
Gold medal – first place	2025 Rio de Janeiro	Team
Junior World Championships
Gold medal – first place	2023 Plovdiv	Team
Cadet World Championships
Bronze medal – third place	2023 Plovdiv	Individual

Emily Jing (born May 13, 2007) is an American right-handed foil fencer. She won a gold medal in the women's team foil event at the 2025 World Fencing Championships.

== Career ==
Jing competed at the 2023 Junior and Cadet Fencing World Championships and won a gold medal in the junior team event and a bronze medal in the cadet individual foil event. She was one of just three Team USA athletes who qualified for both Juniors and Cadets at the World Cadets and Juniors Fencing Championships.

In June 2025, Jing represented the United States at the 2025 Pan American Fencing Championships and won a gold medal in the team foil event. The next month she competed at the 2025 World Fencing Championships and won a gold medal in the women's team foil event.

== Personal life ==
Jing has an older sister, Alexandra, who is also a fencer.

== Medal record ==
=== World Championship ===
Year	Location	Event	Position
2025	(Georgia (country)) Tbilisi, Georgia	Team Women's Foil	1st

=== World Cup ===
Date	Location	Event	Position
2025-11-09	Palma de Mallorca, Spain	Team Women's Foil	2nd

=== Pan American Championship ===
Year	Location	Event	Position
2025	Rio de Janeiro, Brazil	Team Women's Foil	1st
