= Anna Maksymenko =

Ukrainian fencer (born 2007)

Personal information
- Full name: Максименко Анна Олександрівна
- Born: 11 July 2007 (age 19) Lviv, Ukraine

Fencing career
- Sport: Fencing
- Country: Ukraine
- Weapon: épée
- Hand: right
- Club: Dynamo Lviv
- FIE ranking: ranking
Medal record
Women's épée
Representing Ukraine
European Championships
Gold medal – first place	2025 Genoa	Team épée
Bronze medal – third place	2026 Antony	Team épée
Summer Universiade
Silver medal – second place	2025 Essen	Individual épée
World Cadets Championships
Gold medal – first place	2024 Riyadh	Individual épée
Silver medal – second place	2022 Dubai	Individual épée
World Junior Championships
Gold medal – first place	2025 Wuxi	Team épée
Bronze medal – third place	2023 Plovdiv	Individual épée
European U23 Championships
Gold medal – first place	2025 Tallinn	Individual épée
European Cadets Championships
Gold medal – first place	2024 Naples	Individual épée
Gold medal – first place	2024 Naples	Team épée
Bronze medal – third place	2023 Tallinn	Individual épée
Bronze medal – third place	2023 Tallinn	Team épée
European Junior Championships
Gold medal – first place	2024 Naples	Individual épée
Gold medal – first place	2024 Naples	Team épée
Gold medal – first place	2026 Tbilisi	Team épée
Silver medal – second place	2026 Tbilisi	Individual épée

Anna Oleksandrivna Maksymenko (Ukrainian: Анна Олександрівна Максименко; born 11 July 2007) is a Ukrainian épée fencer.

== Career ==
In 2018, Maksymenko debuted at the international junior tournament "Challenge Wratislavia" in Wrocław, winning a bronze medal in individual épée.

In 2021, she won a silver medal at the Budapest Cup in the team épée competition. Maksymenko also received gold in the individual épée competition at the tournament Belgrade Open.

The following year, she competed at the 2022 European Cadets Championships, held in Novi Sad, finishing 6th in the team épée competition.

At the 2022 Junior and Cadet Fencing World Championships in Dubai Maksymenko won a silver medal in the individual épée competition, losing Aleyna Ertürk from Turkey in final tournament.

In 2023, Maksymenko debuted competing at the Junior Fencing World Cup stage in Laupheim, winning a gold medal in the individual épée competition. She also competed at the 2023 European Cadets Championships in Tallinn, where she won two bronze medals in the individual and team épée competitions.

At the 2023 Junior and Cadet Fencing World Championships in Plovdiv Maksymenko won a bronze medal in junior individual épée competition, losing Alicja Klasik from Poland in semifinals.

The following year, Maksymenko became four-time European champion among juniors and cadets at the European Cadets Championships in Naples in the individual and team épée competitions.

Maksymenko also became World champion in the cadets individual épée competition at the 2024 Junior and Cadet Fencing World Championships in Riyadh, defeating Sharika Gajjala from the United States in final tournament.
