= Emily Conrad =

Ukrainian fencer (born 2007)

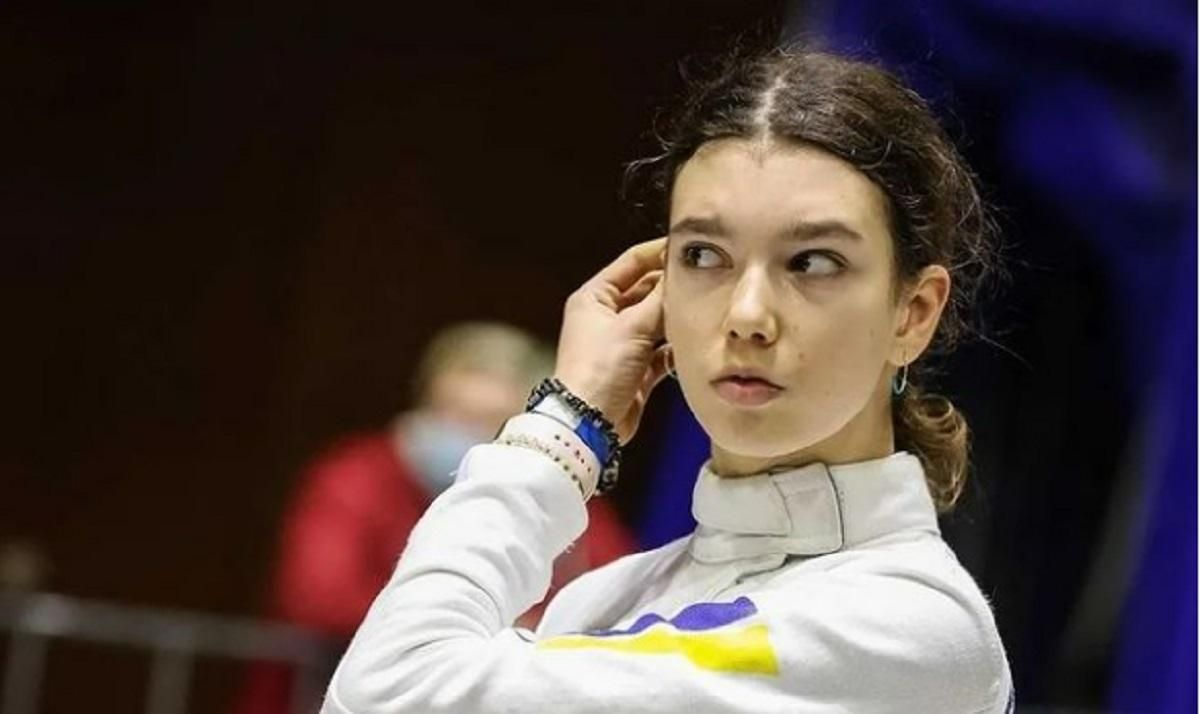

Personal information
- Full name: Емілі Конрад
- Born: 5 August 2007 (age 19) Kyiv, Ukraine

Fencing career
- Sport: Fencing
- Country: Ukraine
- Weapon: épée
- Hand: right
- National coach: Natalia Konrad
- FIE ranking: ranking
Medal record
Women's épée
Representing Ukraine
Summer Universiade
Bronze medal – third place	2025 Essen	Individual épée
Junior World Championships
Gold medal – first place	2025 Wuxi	Team épée
World Cadets Championships
Bronze medal – third place	2024 Riyadh	Individual épée
European Cadets Championships
Gold medal – first place	2023 Tallinn	Individual épée
Gold medal – first place	2024 Naples	Team épée
Bronze medal – third place	2022 Novi Sad	Individual épée
Bronze medal – third place	2023 Tallinn	Team épée
European Junior Championships
Gold medal – first place	2024 Naples	Team épée
Gold medal – first place	2026 Tbilisi	Team épée
Silver medal – second place	2024 Naples	Individual épée
European U23 Championships
Gold medal – first place	2023 Budapest	Individual épée

Emily Conrad (Ukrainian: Емілі Конрад; born 5 August 2007) is a Ukrainian female épée fencer.

== Early life ==
Emily was born on 5 August 2007 in Kyiv. Her mother and coach Natalia Konrad is a 2003 world champion and a 2004 European champion in the individual épée competition.

== Career ==
In 2019, Conrad debuted at the international junior tournament "Challenge Wratislavia" in Wrocław, winning a bronze medal in individual épée.

In 2021, she won silver medals at the Budapest Cup and the Hartmann Cup in the individual épée competition among cadets.

The following year, she competed at the 2022 European Cadets Championships, held in Novi Sad, finishing 6th in the team épée competition and receiving a bronze medal in the individual épée competition.

In 2023, Conrad debuted competing at the Junior Fencing World Cup stage in Maalot, winning a bronze medal in the individual épée competition. Conrad also competed at the 2023 European Cadets Championships in Tallinn, where she won a bronze medal in the team épée competition and a gold one in the individual épée. In that year Conrad became U-23 European champion at the 2023 European U-23 Championships in Budapest in the individual épée competition.

At the 2023 Junior and Cadet Fencing World Championships in Plovdiv Conrad reached 6th in the team épée competition.

The following year, Conrad became twice European champion among juniors and cadets at the European Cadets Championships in Naples in the team épée competition and won a silver medal in the individual épée competition among juniors.

At the 2024 Junior and Cadet Fencing World Championships in Riyadh, Conrad won a bronze medal in the individual épée competition, losing the future champion Sharika Gajjala from the United States in semifinals.
