= List of Turkish football transfers summer 2016 =

This is a list of Turkish football transfers in the 2016 summer transfer window by club. Only clubs in the 2016–17 Süper Lig are included.

== Süper Lig ==
=== Adanaspor ===
In:

No.	Pos.	Nation	Player

Out:

No.	Pos.	Nation	Player
—	MF	(Romania) ROU	Victoraș Astafei (to (Romania) Botoșani)

=== Akhisar Belediyespor ===
In:

No.	Pos.	Nation	Player
—	DF	(Turkey) TUR	Serdar Kesimal (from (Turkey) Fenerbahçe)

Out:

No.	Pos.	Nation	Player

=== Alanyaspor ===
In:

No.	Pos.	Nation	Player

Out:

No.	Pos.	Nation	Player

=== Antalyaspor ===
In:

No.	Pos.	Nation	Player

Out:

No.	Pos.	Nation	Player
—	MF	(Turkey) TUR	Emrah Başsan (to (Turkey) Galatasaray)

=== Beşiktaş ===
In:

No.	Pos.	Nation	Player
4	DF	(Sweden) SWE	Alexander Milošević (loan return from (Germany) Hannover 96)
19	DF	(Colombia) COL	Pedro Franco (loan return from (Argentina) San Lorenzo)
22	MF	(Armenia) ARM	Aras Özbiliz (loan return from (Spain) Rayo Vallecano)
30	DF	(Brazil) BRA	Marcelo (from (Germany) Hannover 96, previously on loan)
77	DF	(Turkey) TUR	Gökhan Gönül (from (Turkey) Fenerbahçe)
—	GK	(Spain) ESP	Fabricio (from (Spain) Deportivo La Coruña)
—	DF	(Brazil) BRA	Adriano (from (Spain) Barcelona)

Out:

No.	Pos.	Nation	Player
2	DF	(Turkey) TUR	Serdar Kurtuluş (to (Turkey) Bursaspor)
3	DF	(Turkey) TUR	İsmail Köybaşı (to (Turkey) Fenerbahçe)
7	MF	(Turkey) TUR	Gökhan Töre (on loan to (England) West Ham United)
12	DF	(Spain) ESP	Alexis (to (Spain) Alavés)
14	FW	(Turkey) TUR	Furkan Yaman (on loan to (Turkey) Kayserispor)
19	DF	(Colombia) COL	Pedro Franco (on loan to (Colombia) Millonarios)
27	GK	(Turkey) TUR	Günay Güvenç (to (Turkey) Göztepe)

=== Bursaspor ===
In:

No.	Pos.	Nation	Player
—	DF	(Turkey) TUR	Serdar Kurtuluş (from (Turkey) Beşiktaş)

Out:

No.	Pos.	Nation	Player
19	FW	(Belgium) BEL	Tom De Sutter (to (Belgium) Lokeren)
—	DF	(Turkey) TUR	Serdar Aziz (to (Turkey) Galatasaray)

=== Çaykur Rizespor ===
In:

No.	Pos.	Nation	Player
—	DF	(Iran) IRN	Ramin Rezaeian (from (Iran) Persepolis)

Out:

No.	Pos.	Nation	Player

=== Fenerbahçe ===
In:

No.	Pos.	Nation	Player
13	DF	(Turkey) TUR	İsmail Köybaşı (from (Turkey) Beşiktaş)
23	DF	(Netherlands) NED	Gregory van der Wiel (from (France) Paris Saint Germain)
33	DF	(Russia) RUS	Roman Neustädter (from (Germany) Schalke 04)
37	DF	(Slovakia) SVK	Martin Škrtel (from (England) Liverpool)
40	GK	(Brazil) BRA	Fabiano (on loan from (Portugal) Porto)
92	MF	(Morocco) MAR	Aatif Chahechouhe (from (Turkey) Sivasspor)
—	MF	(Netherlands) NED	Jeremain Lens (on loan from (England) Sunderland)

Out:

No.	Pos.	Nation	Player
10	MF	(Brazil) BRA	Diego (to (Brazil) Flamengo)
17	MF	(Portugal) POR	Nani (to (Spain) Valencia)
22	DF	(Portugal) POR	Bruno Alves (to (Italy) Cagliari)
24	DF	(Czech Republic) CZE	Michal Kadlec (to (Czech Republic) Sparta Prague)
40	GK	(Brazil) BRA	Fabiano (loan return to (Portugal) Porto)
50	MF	(Serbia) SRB	Lazar Marković (loan return to (England) Liverpool)
53	DF	(Senegal) SEN	Abdoulaye Ba (loan return to (Portugal) Porto)
77	DF	(Turkey) TUR	Gökhan Gönül (to (Turkey) Beşiktaş)
88	DF	(Turkey) TUR	Caner Erkin (to (Italy) Inter Milan)
—	DF	(Turkey) TUR	Serdar Kesimal (to (Turkey) Akhisar Belediyespor)
—	MF	(Sweden) SWE	Samuel Holmén (to (Turkey) İstanbul Başakşehir)

=== Galatasaray ===
In:

No.	Pos.	Nation	Player
4	DF	(Turkey) TUR	Serdar Aziz (from (Turkey) Bursaspor)
17	MF	(Turkey) TUR	Emrah Başsan (from (Turkey) Antalyaspor)
20	MF	(Portugal) POR	Bruma (loan return from (Spain) Real Sociedad)
27	MF	(Germany) GER	Tolga Ciğerci (from (Germany) Hertha BSC)

Out:

No.	Pos.	Nation	Player
14	MF	(Spain) ESP	José Rodríguez (to (Germany) Mainz 05)
52	FW	(Turkey) TUR	Emre Çolak (to (Spain) Deportivo La Coruña)

=== Gaziantepspor ===
In:

No.	Pos.	Nation	Player
—	DF	(Netherlands) NED	Bart van Hintum (from (Netherlands) PEC Zwolle)
—	MF	(Belarus) BLR	Syarhey Kislyak (from (Russia) Rubin Kazan)

Out:

No.	Pos.	Nation	Player

=== Gençlerbirliği ===
In:

No.	Pos.	Nation	Player
—	MF	(Serbia) SRB	Marko Milinković (from (Slovakia) Slovan Bratislava)
—	MF	(Ghana) GHA	Samuel Owusu (from (Serbia) Radnik Surdulica)

Out:

No.	Pos.	Nation	Player
30	FW	(Angola) ANG	Djalma (to (Greece) PAOK)

=== İstanbul Başakşehir ===
In:

No.	Pos.	Nation	Player
—	MF	(Senegal) SEN	Cheikhou Dieng (from (Austria) St. Pölten)
—	MF	(Sweden) SWE	Samuel Holmén (from (Turkey) Fenerbahçe)

Out:

No.	Pos.	Nation	Player
—	MF	(Turkey) TUR	Cenk Şahin (on loan to (Germany) St. Pauli)
—	FW	(France) FRA	Jérémy Perbet (to (Belgium) Gent)

=== Karabükspor ===
In:

No.	Pos.	Nation	Player
—	DF	(Romania) ROU	Valerică Găman (from (Romania) Astra Giurgiu)

Out:

No.	Pos.	Nation	Player
89	FW	(Democratic Republic of the Congo) COD	Junior Kabananga (loan return to (Kazakhstan) Astana)
—	MF	(Japan) JPN	Takayuki Seto (on loan to (Romania) Astra Giurgiu)

=== Kasımpaşa ===
In:

No.	Pos.	Nation	Player

Out:

No.	Pos.	Nation	Player

=== Kayserispor ===
In:

No.	Pos.	Nation	Player
—	FW	(Turkey) TUR	Furkan Yaman (on loan from (Turkey) Beşiktaş)

Out:

No.	Pos.	Nation	Player
—	MF	(Netherlands) NED	Diego Biseswar (to (Greece) PAOK)

=== Konyaspor ===
In:

No.	Pos.	Nation	Player
—	MF	(Bosnia and Herzegovina) BIH	Deni Milošević (from (Belgium) Standard Liège)

Out:

No.	Pos.	Nation	Player
—	DF	(Cyprus) CYP	Dossa Júnior (to (Cyprus) AEL Limassol)

=== Osmanlıspor ===
In:

No.	Pos.	Nation	Player

Out:

No.	Pos.	Nation	Player

=== Trabzonspor ===
In:

No.	Pos.	Nation	Player
90	FW	(Azerbaijan) AZE	Ramil Sheydayev (from (Russia) Zenit)
—	DF	(Slovakia) SVK	Ján Ďurica (from (Russia) Lokomotiv Moscow)
—	MF	(Slovakia) SVK	Matúš Bero (from (Slovakia) Trenčín)
—	MF	(Nigeria) NGA	Ogenyi Onazi (from (Italy) Lazio)

Out:

No.	Pos.	Nation	Player
