= Alara Atmaca =

Turkish fencer (born 2009)

Personal information
- Born: 10 March 2009 (age 17) Balıkesir, Turkey

Sport
- Sport: Fencing
Medal record
Women's Fencing
Representing Turkey
Islamic Solidarity Games
Gold medal – first place	2025 Riyadh	Foil
European Junior Championships
Bronze medal – third place	2026 Tbilisi	Individual Foil
European Cadet Championships
Gold medal – first place	2026 Tbilisi	Individual Foil

Alara Atmaca (born 10 March 2009) is a Turkish fencer who competes in the foil event.

== Sport career ==
Atmaca won the silver medal at the 2024 Cadets Circuit Eislingen in Germany, and another silver medal at the 2024 Cadet Circuit Nurenberg in Germany.

She won the gold medal at the 2025 Cadets Circuit Sofia in Bulgaria. and another gold medal in the U17 category at the 2025 European Cadets and Juniors Fencing Championships in Antalya, Turkey. At the 2025 Cadet Circuit Samorin in Slovakia, she placed fifth. She won the gold medal in team event with her three teammates.

She competed in the foil event at the 2025 Islamic Solidarity Games in Riyadh, Saudi Arabia, and won the gold medal.

== Personal life ==
A native of Balıkesir, Turkey, Alara Atmaca was born on 10 March 2009.
