= Fencing at the 2026 Summer Youth Olympics – Women's épée =

Women's épée fencing event at the 2026 Summer Youth Olympics

Women's épée at the IV Summer Youth Olympic Games
- Venue: Dakar Expo Center
- Dates: 10 November
- Competitors: 14 from 14 nations

Medalists
1st place, gold medalist(s)		HORVATH Lotti; Hungary
2nd place, silver medalist(s)		DMYTRUK Alina; Ukraine
3rd place, bronze medalist(s)		AINA Francesca; Italy

The women's épée competition at the 2026 Summer Youth Olympics was held at the Dakar Expo Center in Dakar, Senegal, on 10 November 2026. Fourteen fencers from fourteen National Olympic Committees competed in the event.

== Schedule ==
The competition was held on 10 November 2026 at the Dakar Expo Center. All times were as listed in the official competition schedule.

Date	Time	Estimated finish	Phase
10 November 2026	09:00	10:45	Pool round
10 November 2026	11:15	11:55	Table of 16
10 November 2026	12:15	12:35	Table of 8
10 November 2026	14:00	14:40	Semifinals
10 November 2026	15:00	15:20	Bronze medal bout
10 November 2026	15:30	15:50	Gold medal bout

== Format ==
The competition consisted of a pool round followed by direct elimination. Fourteen fencers were divided into two pools. The pool round was followed by the Table of 16, Table of 8, semifinals and medal bouts.

== Results ==
=== Pool round ===
Fourteen fencers competed in two pools. The following tables show the pool results as published by the official Dakar 2026 results service.

==== Pool 1 ====
Pos.	Athlete	(Italy)	(Oman)	(Chinese Taipei)	(Iran)	(Senegal)	(Angola)	(Benin)	V#	M#	V/M	HS	HR	Diff.	PR
1	AINA Francesca (ITA)		V2	V	V	V	V		5	5	1.000	22	8	+14	1
2	AL SHARJI Jana (OMA)	1		2	V	V	V		3	5	0.600	18	11	+7	2
3	LIN Ariel (TPE)	4	V3		V	3	V		3	5	0.600	20	16	+4	3
4	MADANI Ghazal (IRI)	1	3	4		V4	V		2	5	0.400	17	21	−4	4
5	MBAYE Ndeye Mane (SEN)	1	3	V4	2		V		2	5	0.400	15	19	−4	5
6	SABONETE Joana (ANG)	1	0	1	4	2			0	5	0.000	8	25	−17	6
7	FASSASSI Olahitan Faridath (BEN)								0	0	0.000	0	0	0	7

==== Pool 2 ====
Pos.	Athlete	(Ukraine)	(Hungary)	(Peru)	(Estonia)	(South Africa)	(Ivory Coast)	(Kenya)	V#	M#	V/M	HS	HR	Diff.	PR
1	DMYTRUK Alina (UKR)		V	V	V	V	V	V	6	6	1.000	30	13	+17	1
2	HORVATH Lotti (HUN)	4		V	V	V	V	V	5	6	0.833	29	12	+17	2
3	BRAVO Astrid (PER)	3	1		V	V	V	V	4	6	0.667	24	21	+3	3
4	NIKOLAJEVA Aleksandra (EST)	3	4	2		V	V	V	3	6	0.500	24	19	+5	4
5	VENTURAS Nikita (RSA)	3	1	2	1		V	V	2	6	0.333	17	24	−7	5
6	KOUASSI Marie (CIV)	0	1	4	2	2		V	1	6	0.167	14	28	−14	6
7	MAKENA Aliyah (KEN)	0	0	3	1	2	3		0	6	0.000	9	30	−21	7

Legend

- V – Victory
- V4 – Victory with four hits received
- Number – Hits scored by the fencer in a lost bout
- V# – Number of victories
- M# – Number of bouts
- V/M – Victory index (victories divided by bouts)
- HS – Hits scored
- HR – Hits received
- Diff. – Difference between hits scored and hits received (HS − HR)
- PR – Rank in pool
- MED – Medical

=== Bracket ===
Table of 16
1	DMYTRUK Alina (UKR)	BYE
16
9	MBAYE Ndeye Mane (SEN)	5
8	MADANI Ghazal (IRI)	15
5	AL SHARJI Jana (OMA)	15
12	SABONETE Joana (ANG)	4
13	MAKENA Aliyah (KEN)	2
4	BRAVO Astrid (PER)	15
3	HORVATH Lotti (HUN)	BYE
11
11	KOUASSI Marie (CIV)	6
6	LIN Ariel (TPE)	15
7	NIKOLAJEVA Aleksandra (EST)	15
10	VENTURAS Nikita (RSA)	12
15	Bye	BYE
2	AINA Francesca (ITA)	BYE

Quarterfinals
1	DMYTRUK Alina (UKR)	15
8	MADANI Ghazal (IRI)	5
5	AL SHARJI Jana (OMA)	15
4	BRAVO Astrid (PER)	13
3	HORVATH Lotti (HUN)	15
6	LIN Ariel (TPE)	9
7	NIKOLAJEVA Aleksandra (EST)	5
2	AINA Francesca (ITA)	15

Semifinals
1	DMYTRUK Alina (UKR)	15
5	AL SHARJI Jana (OMA)	9
3	HORVATH Lotti (HUN)	15
2	AINA Francesca (ITA)	7

Finals
1	DMYTRUK Alina (UKR)	12
3	HORVATH Lotti (HUN)	15
Bronze medal match
5	AL SHARJI Jana (OMA)	8
2	AINA Francesca (ITA)	15

=== Final standings ===
Rank	Athlete	Nation
1st place, gold medalist(s)	Lotti Horvath	Hungary
2nd place, silver medalist(s)	Alina Dmytruk	Ukraine
3rd place, bronze medalist(s)	Francesca Aina	Italy
4	Jana Al Sharji	Oman
5	Astrid Bravo	Peru
6	Ariel Lin	Chinese Taipei
7	Aleksandra Nikolajeva	Estonia
8	Ghazal Madani	Iran
9	Ndeye Mane Mbaye	Senegal
10	Nikita Venturas	South Africa
11	Marie Kouassi	Ivory Coast
12	Joana Sabonete	Angola
13	Aliyah Makena	Kenya
—	Olahitan Faridath Fassassi (MED)	Benin
