= Lotti Horváth =

Hungarian fencer (born 2009)

Personal information
- Born: 13 January 2009 (age 17)

Fencing career
- Sport: Fencing
- Country: Hungary
- Weapon: Épée
- Hand: Right-handed
Medal record
Women's Épée
Representing Hungary
Junior World Championships
Silver medal – second place	2026 Rio de Janeiro	Team
Cadet World Championships
Gold medal – first place	2025 Wuxi	Individual
Gold medal – first place	2026 Rio de Janeiro	Individual
European Junior Championships
Silver medal – second place	2026 Tbilisi	Team
Youth Olympic Games
Gold medal – first place	2026 Dakar	Individual

Lotti Horváth (born 13 January 2009) is a Hungarian right-handed épée fencer.

== Career ==
In April 2025, Horváth competed at the 2025 Cadet Fencing World Championships and won a gold medal in the individual épée event. She repeated as the individual épée champion at the 2026 Cadet Fencing World Championships. She became the first Hungarian in the history of épée to become a two-time cadet world champion, and only the second Hungarian fencer to accomplish this, following Liza Pusztai.

In April 2026, she competed at the 2026 Junior Fencing World Championships and won a silver medal in the team event. In November 2026, she represented Hungary at the 2026 Summer Youth Olympics and won a gold medal in the individual épée event.
