= Hungary at the 2025 Summer World University Games =

- Flag of Hungary
- IOC code: HUN
- National federation: Hungarian University Sports Federation

in Rhine-Ruhr, Germany 16 July 2025 – 27 July 2025
- Competitors: 175 in 16 sports
- Flag bearer: Gergő Horváth (fencing)
- Medals Ranked 44th: Gold 0 Silver 10 Bronze 8 Total 18

Summer World University Games appearances
- 1959; 1961; 1963; 1965; 1967; 1970; 1973; 1975; 1977; 1979; 1981; 1983; 1985; 1987; 1989; 1991; 1993; 1995; 1997; 1999; 2001; 2003; 2005; 2007; 2009; 2011; 2013; 2015; 2017; 2019; 2021; 2025; 2027

Hungary competed at the 2025 Summer World University Games in Rhine-Ruhr, Germany held from 16 to 27 July 2025. Hungary was represented by 175 athletes and took forty-fourth place in the medal table with eighteen medals. Gergő Horváth (fencing) was a flag bearer at the opening ceremony.

== Medal summary ==
=== Medal by sports ===
Rank	Sports	Gold	Silver	Bronze	Total
1	Fencing	0	4	1	5
2	Athletics	0	3	3	6
3	Judo	0	1	1	2
4	Artistic gymnastics	0	1	0	1
4	Swimming	0	1	0	1
6	Rhythmic gymnastics	0	0	2	2
7	Basketball	0	0	1	1
Totals (7 entries)		0	10	8	18

Source: rhineruhr2025.com

=== Medalists ===
Medal	Name	Sport	Event	Date
Silver	Gergő Horváth	Fencing	Men's sabre individual	17 July
Silver	Soma Somody	Fencing	Men's epee individual	18 July
Silver	Anna Spiesz	Fencing	Women's sabre individual	19 July
Silver	Soma Somody; Maruán Osman-Touson; Gergely Kovács; Ádám Keresztes	Fencing	Men's epee team	21 July
Silver	Beatrix Tankó	Swimming	Women's 100m butterfly	21 July
Silver	Patrik Enyingi	Athletics	Men's 400m	23 July
Silver	Róza Gyertyás	Judo	Women -57 kg	23 July
Silver	Szabina Szűcs	Athletics	Women's heptathlon	24 July
Silver	Anna Tóth	Athletics	Women's 100m hurdles	25 July
Silver	Zója Székely	Artistic gymnastics	Women's uneven bars	26 July
Bronze	Edina Kardos	Fencing	Women's epee individual	17 July
Bronze	Fanni Pigniczki	Rhythmic gymnastics	Individual all-around	18 July
Bronze	Fanni Pigniczki	Rhythmic gymnastics	Individual hoop	19 July
Bronze	Sára Mátó	Athletics	Women's 400m hurdles	24 July
Bronze	Z Sitku; S Laczkó; B Angyal; T Dúl; E Varga; R Dombai / D Takács; P Dúl; L Krasovec; J Gyöngyösi; Z Telegdy; F Tóth	Basketball	Women	25 July
Bronze	Gergely Nerpel	Judo	Men -90 kg	25 July
Bronze	István Palkovits	Athletics	Men's 3000m steeplechase	26 July
Bronze	Márton Böndör	Athletics	Men's pole vault	27 July
