= 2024 Junior and Cadet Fencing World Championships =

Fencing championships in Saudi Arabia

- Dates: 12–20 April
- Host city: Riyadh, Saudi Arabia
- Venue: King Saud University Sports Arena
- Events: 18

The 2024 Junior and Cadet Fencing World Championships took place from 12 to 20 April 2024 in Riyadh, Saudi Arabia.

== Medals summary ==
=== Junior ===
==== Men ====
Event	Gold	Silver	Bronze
Épée Individual	Alban Aebersold; Switzerland	Alec Brooke; Great Britain	Samuel Imrek; United States
Épée Individual	Alban Aebersold; Switzerland	Alec Brooke; Great Britain	Nicolò Del Contrasto; Italy
Épée Team	Italy; Nicolò Del Contrasto; Matteo Galassi; Fabio Mastromarino; Jacopo Rizzi	France; Odinn Bindas; Clément Boulière; Auxence Dorigo; Nolan Wingerter	Switzerland; Alban Aebersold; Aurele Favre; Colin Mumenthaler; Juliano Nicola Squieri
Foil Individual	Ryosuke Fukuda; Japan	David Sosnov; Great Britain	Samarth Kumbla; United States
Foil Individual	Ryosuke Fukuda; Japan	David Sosnov; Great Britain	Eliot Chagnon; France
Foil Team	United States; Andrew Chen; Chase Emmer; Samarth Kumbla; Daniel Zhang	Italy; Mattia De Cristofaro; Federico Greganti; Gregorio Isolani; Marco Panazzolo	Japan; Atsuki Chiba; Ryosuke Fukuda; Hikaru Masuda; Takushin Tanaka
Sabre Individual	Vlad Covaliu; Romania	Pavel Graudyn; Individual Neutral Athletes	Santiago Madrigal; Spain
Sabre Individual	Vlad Covaliu; Romania	Pavel Graudyn; Individual Neutral Athletes	William Morrill; United States
Sabre Team	United States; Colin Heathcock; Cody Walter Ji; William Morrill; Jordan Silberzweig	Romania; Casian Cidu; Vlad Covaliu; Mihnea Enache; Radu Niţu	Italy; Edoardo Cantini; Francesco Pagano; Edoardo Reale; Marco Stigliano

==== Women ====
Event	Gold	Silver	Bronze
Épée Individual	Océane Francillonne; France	Julia Yin; Canada	Leehi Machulsky; United States
Épée Individual	Océane Francillonne; France	Julia Yin; Canada	Anita Corradino; Italy
Épée Team	United States; Sarah Gu; Michaela Joyce; Yasmine Khamis; Leehi Machulsky	Italy; Anita Corradino; Allegra Cristofoletto; Eleonora Orso; Vittoria Siletti	France; Anaëlle Doquet; Océane Francillonne; Thaïs Naucelle-Jardel; Lana Tarin
Foil Individual	Jessica Guo; Canada	Irene Bertini; Italy	Vittoria Pinna; Italy
Foil Individual	Jessica Guo; Canada	Irene Bertini; Italy	Rino Nagase; Japan
Foil Team	Italy; Irene Bertini; Greta Collini; Matilde Molinari; Vittoria Pinna	Japan; Honami Chiba; Rino Nagase; Hiyori Nakade; Yuzuha Takeyama	South Korea; Kim Min-ji; Lee Chae-hee; Mo Byeo-li; Shin Min-chae
Sabre Individual	Pan Qimiao; China	Aleksandra Mikhailova; Individual Neutral Athletes	Luisa Herrera; Uzbekistan
Sabre Individual	Pan Qimiao; China	Aleksandra Mikhailova; Individual Neutral Athletes	Alejandra Manga; France
Sabre Team	France; Roxane Chabrol; Alejandra Manga; Aurore Patrice; Toscane Tori	Italy; Alessandra Nicolai; Maria Clementina Polli; Manuela Spica; Mariella Viale	Hungary; Emese Domonkos; Csenge Kónya; Zsanett Kovács; Anna Spiesz

=== Cadet ===
==== Men ====
Event	Gold	Silver	Bronze
Épée	Doruk Erolçevik; Turkey	Eslam Osama; Egypt	Alexander Bezrodnov; United States
Épée	Doruk Erolçevik; Turkey	Eslam Osama; Egypt	Federico Varone; Italy
Foil	Lyu Weiqiao; China	Jeidus Deseranno; United States	Jia Bao Xu; Canada
Foil	Lyu Weiqiao; China	Jeidus Deseranno; United States	Luk Chun Lok; Hong Kong
Sabre	Sardor Abdukarimbekov; Uzbekistan	Alpamis Urakboev; Uzbekistan	Motoki Kawahara; Japan
Sabre	Sardor Abdukarimbekov; Uzbekistan	Alpamis Urakboev; Uzbekistan	Kim Do-yeon; South Korea

==== Women ====
Event	Gold	Silver	Bronze
Épée	Anna Maksymenko; Ukraine	Sharika Gajjala; United States	Emily Conrad; Ukraine
Épée	Anna Maksymenko; Ukraine	Sharika Gajjala; United States	Jiang Huishuang; China
Foil	Jaelyn Liu; United States	Polina Volobueva; Individual Neutral Athletes	Yunjia Zhang; Canada
Foil	Jaelyn Liu; United States	Polina Volobueva; Individual Neutral Athletes	Natasza Kuś; Poland
Sabre	Dorottya Csonka; Hungary	Francesca Lentini; Italy	Vittoria Mocci; Italy
Sabre	Dorottya Csonka; Hungary	Francesca Lentini; Italy	Nargiza Jaksybaeva; Uzbekistan

== Medal table ==
* Host nation (Saudi Arabia)

Rank	Nation	Gold	Silver	Bronze	Total
1	United States	4	2	5	11
2	Italy	2	5	6	13
3	France	2	1	3	6
4	China	2	0	1	3
5	Japan	1	1	3	5
6	Canada	1	1	2	4
6	Uzbekistan	1	1	2	4
8	Romania	1	1	0	2
9	Hungary	1	0	1	2
9	Switzerland	1	0	1	2
9	Ukraine	1	0	1	2
12	Turkey	1	0	0	1
–	Individual Neutral Athletes	0	3	0	3
13	Great Britain	0	2	0	2
14	Egypt	0	1	0	1
15	South Korea	0	0	2	2
16	Hong Kong	0	0	1	1
16	Poland	0	0	1	1
16	Spain	0	0	1	1
Totals (18 entries)		18	18	30	66
