= European Cadets and Juniors Fencing Championships =

Fencing competition

- Organiser: European Fencing Confederation
- Website: eurofencing.info

The European Cadets and Juniors Fencing Championships, sometimes referred to as the European U17 and U20 Fencing Championships, are an annual fencing competition organized by the European Fencing Confederation (EFC), featuring Europe’s top athletes in the cadet (under 17) and junior (under 20) age categories. The event includes individual and team competitions across all three weapons: foil, épée, and sabre.

== History ==
The junior championships were first held in 2009, with the cadets joining the following year. Since 2012, both championships have been hosted jointly in a single venue, typically over a 9–10 day period in late February or early March.

The competition serves as a key developmental milestone for young fencers, often acting as a stepping stone to the World Cadets and Juniors Fencing Championships and senior-level European and World Championships.

== Editions ==
Year	Host city	Country	Cadet events	Junior events	Total events	Top nation
2009	Odense	Denmark	-	6 individual + 6 team	12	
2010	Lobyna	Russia	-	6 individual + 6 team	12	
2010	Athens	Greece	6 individual + 6 team	-	12	
2011	Klagenfurt	Austria	-	6 individual + 6 team	12	
2012	Poreč	Croatia	6 individual + 6 team	6 individual + 6 team	24	
2013	Budapest	Hungary	6 individual + 6 team	6 individual + 6 team	24	
2014	Jerusalem	Israel	6 individual + 6 team	6 individual + 6 team	24	
2015	Maribor	Slovenia	6 individual + 6 team	6 individual + 6 team	24	
2016	Novi Sad	Serbia	6 individual + 6 team	6 individual + 6 team	24	
2017	Plovdiv	Bulgaria	6 individual + 6 team	6 individual + 6 team	24	
2018	Sochi	Russia	6 individual + 6 team	6 individual + 6 team	24	
2019	Foggia	Italy	6 individual + 6 team	6 individual + 6 team	24	
2020	Poreč	Croatia	6 individual + 6 team	6 individual + 6 team	24	
2021	not held					
2022	Novi Sad	Serbia	6 individual + 6 team	6 individual + 6 team	24	Hungary
2023	Tallinn	Estonia	6 individual + 6 team	6 individual + 6 team	24	Italy
2024	Naples	Italy	6 individual + 6 team	6 individual + 6 team	24	Italy
2025	Antalya	Turkey	6 individual + 6 team	6 individual + 6 team	24	Italy
2026	Tbilisi	Georgia	6 individual + 6 team	6 individual + 6 team	24	
2027	Rome	Italy	6 individual + 6 team	6 individual + 6 team	24	

== Format ==
Each edition of the championships includes:

- Individual events in foil, épée, and sabre for both men and women in cadet and junior categories.
- Team events in the same weapons and age groups.
- A rotating host city selected by the EFC, with recent editions held in cities such as Novi Sad (Serbia), Tallinn (Estonia), and Antalya (Turkey).

== Significance ==
The championships are widely regarded as the most prestigious youth fencing events in Europe. They provide:

- International experience for emerging athletes.
- A platform for national federations to assess talent.
- Qualification points for European rankings and selection to world-level events.

== Notable alumni ==
Many successful senior fencers in Europe began their careers at the European Cadet and Junior Championships, including Olympic and World Championship medalists from Italy, France, Hungary, and Russia.
