= Oman at the 2026 Summer Youth Olympics =

- Flag of Oman
- IOC code: OMA
- NOC: Oman Olympic Committee

in Dakar, Senegal October 31, 2026 – November 13, 2026
- Competitors: 3 in 3 sports
- Flag bearer: Hamed Al Hasani
- Medals: Gold 0 Silver 0 Bronze 0 Total 0

Summer Youth Olympics appearances
- 2010; 2014; 2018; 2026

Oman is scheduled to compete at the 2026 Summer Youth Olympics in Dakar, Senegal from October 31 to November 13, 2026. This will mark Oman's fourth appearance at the Youth Olympics, after making its debut in 2010.

Swimmer Hamed Al Hasani served as the flag bearer for the opening ceremony.

== Competitors ==
The following is the list of number of competitors participating at the Games per sport/discipline.

Sport	Men	Women	Total
Fencing	0	1	1
Swimming	1	0	1
Taekwondo	1	0	1
Total	2	1	3

== Fencing ==
Oman entered one female athlete.

Athlete	Event	Round of 64	Round of 32	Round of 16	Quarterfinal	Semifinal	Final / BM	
Athlete	Event	Opposition Score	Opposition Score	Opposition Score	Opposition Score	Opposition Score	Opposition Score	Rank
Jana Al Sharji	Women's épée							

== Swimming ==
Oman entered one male swimmer.

Athlete	Event	Heat		Semifinal		Final	
Athlete	Event	Time	Rank	Time	Rank	Time	Rank
Hamed Al Hasani	400 m freestyle						
Hamed Al Hasani	800 m freestyle						

== Taekwondo ==
Oman entered one female athlete.

Women

Athlete	Event	Round of 16	Quarterfinals	Semifinals	Repechage	Final / BM	
Athlete	Event	Opposition Result	Opposition Result	Opposition Result	Opposition Result	Opposition Result	Rank
Zeyad Al Balushi	–48 kg						
