= Vlad Covaliu =

Romanian fencer (born 2005)

Personal information
- Born: 30 September 2005 (age 20)

Fencing career
- Sport: Fencing
- Country: Romania
- Weapon: Sabre
- Hand: Right-handed
Medal record
Men's sabre
Representing Romania
World Championships
Bronze medal – third place	2025 Tbilisi	Team
Bronze medal – third place	2026 Hong Kong	Team
European Championships
Silver medal – second place	2024 Basel	Team
Silver medal – second place	2026 Antony	Team
Junior World Championships
Gold medal – first place	2024 Riyadh	Individual
Silver medal – second place	2024 Riyadh	Team
Silver medal – second place	2025 Wuxi	Individual
Bronze medal – third place	2023 Plovdiv	Team

Vlad Covaliu (born 30 September 2005) is an Romanian right-handed sabre fencer.

== Early life and education ==
Covaliu is the son of former Olympic fencer Mihai Covaliu.

He attends St. John's University where he is a member of the fencing team.

== Career ==
In April 2024, Covaliu competed at the 2024 Junior Fencing World Championships and won a gold medal in the individual event. In June 2024, he competed at the 2024 European Fencing Championships and won a silver medal in the team sabre event.

In July 2025, he competed at the 2025 World Fencing Championships and won a bronze medal in the team sabre event.

In June 2026, he competed at the 2026 European Fencing Championships and won a silver medal in the team sabre event.
