= Soma Somody =

Hungarian épée fencer

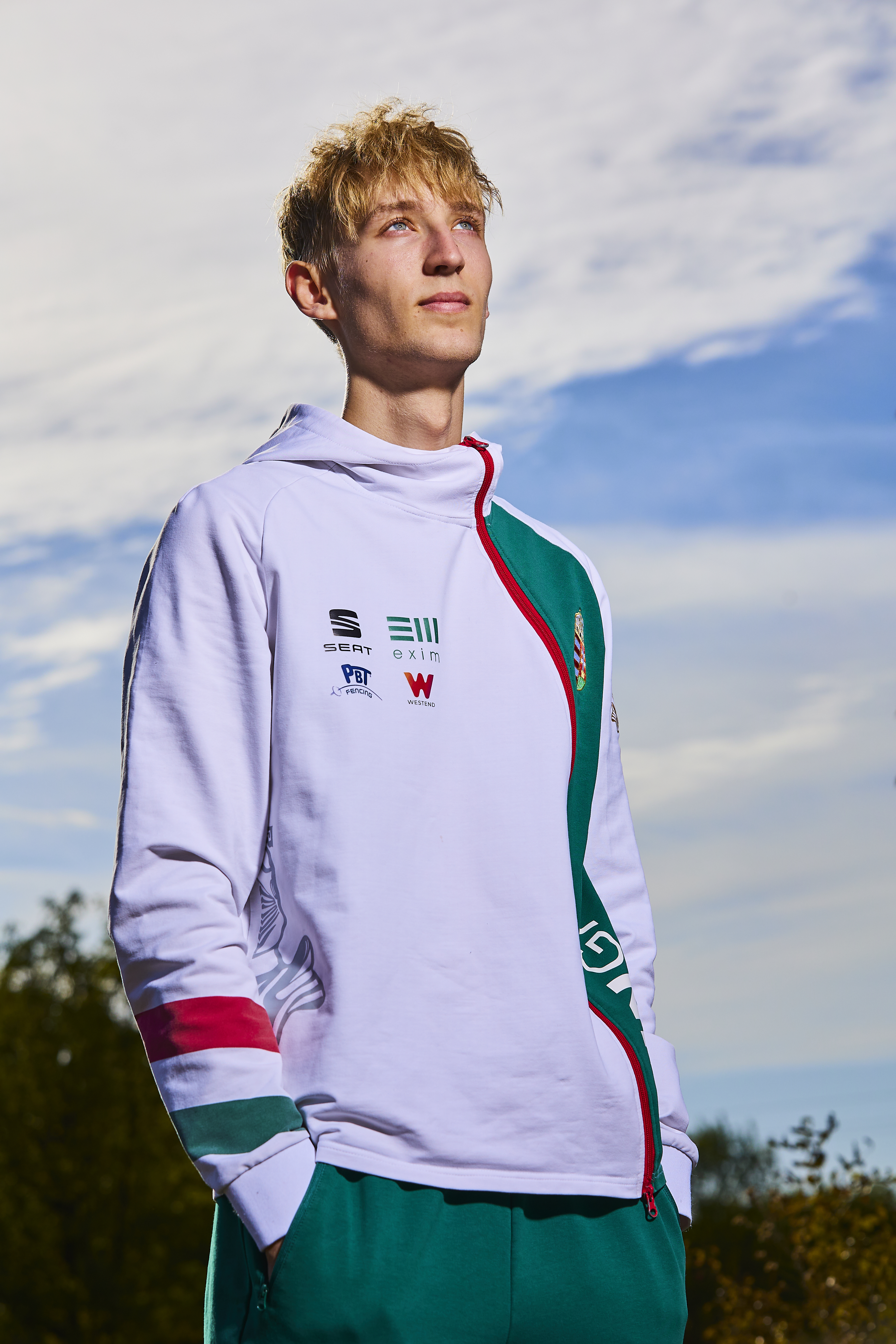

Personal information
- Born: 22 May 2004 (age 22) Budapest, Hungary
- Height: 187 cm (6 ft 2 in)
- Weight: 64 kg (141 lb)

Fencing career
- Sport: Fencing
- Country: Hungary
- Weapon: Épée
- Hand: right-handed
- National coach: Tamás Dancsházi-Nagy
- Club: MTK (2013– )
- Head coach: Dániel Bojti
- Former coach: Tibor Török
- FIE ranking: FIE current ranking
Medal record
Men's épée
Representing Hungary
Event	1st	2nd	3rd
U23 European Championships	1	1	0
Junior World Championships	0	0	2
Junior European Championships	1	0	1
Universiade	0	2	0
Cadets European Championships	0	0	1
Total	2	3	4
U23 European Championships
Gold medal – first place	2024 Antalya	Team
Silver medal – second place	2023 Budapest	Team
Junior World Championships
Bronze medal – third place	2023 Plovdiv	Individual
Bronze medal – third place	2023 Plovdiv	Team
European Junior Championships
Gold medal – first place	2023 Tallinn	Individual
Bronze medal – third place	2023 Tallinn	Team
Universiade
Silver medal – second place	2025 Essen	Individual
Silver medal – second place	2025 Essen	Team
European Cadets Championships
Bronze medal – third place	2020 Poreč	Team
National Championships
Silver medal – second place	2024 Budapest	Individual
Silver medal – second place	2024 Budapest	Team
Bronze medal – third place	2024 Budapest	Team

Soma Somody (born 22 May 2004) is a Hungarian right-handed épée fencer, U23 European Champion, Universiade silver medalist, junior European Champion and junior world championship bronze medalist Hungarian fencer.

== Medal Record ==
=== U23 European Championship ===
Date	Location	Event	Position
27.5.2023	Budapest, Hungary	Team Men's Épée	2nd
4.6.2024	Antalya, Turkey	Team Men's Épée	1st

=== Junior World Championship ===
Date	Location	Event	Position
7.4.2023	Plovdiv, Bulgaria	Individual Men's Épée	3rd
9.4.2023	Plovdiv, Bulgaria	Team Men's Épée	3rd

=== Junior European Championship ===
Date	Location	Event	Position
25.2.2023	Tallinn, Estonia	Individual Men's Épée	3rd
27.2.2023	Tallinn, Estonia	Team Men's Épée	1st

=== Universiade - FISU World University Games ===
Date	Location	Event	Position
18.7.2025	Essen, Germany	Individual Men's Épée	2nd
21.7.2025	Essen, Germany	Team Men's Épée	2nd

=== Cadet European Championship ===
Date	Location	Event	Position
25.2.2020	Poreč, Croatia	Team Men's Épée	3rd

=== World Cups and Grand Prix ===
Date	Location	Event	Position
10.3.2023	Budapest, Hungary	Individual Men's Épée	32rd
18.5.2024	Saint-Maur-des-Fossés, France	Individual Men's Épée	37th
9.11.2024	Bern, Switzerland	Individual Men's Épée	42th
23.11.2024	Vancouver, Canada	Individual Men's Épée	38th
26.01.2025	Doha, Qatar	Individual Men's Épée	22nd
29.03.2025	Marrakesh, Morocco	Individual Men's Épée	22nd

=== National Championships ===
Date	Location	Event	Position
26.05.2024	Budapest, Hungary	Team Men's Épée	2nd
20.12.2024	Budapest, Hungary	Individual Men's Épée	2nd
22.12.2024	Budapest, Hungary	Individual Men's Épée	3rd

== Personal life ==
He was born in 2004 in Budapest. He still lives here with his parents and two siblings, Bonca and Zorka. Full-time university student at the Budapest University of Technology and Economics, Department of Communication and Media Studies.

He started fencing when he was 9 years old, and his coaches immediately directed him towards épée. He has been competing since the age of 10, initially in the Olimpici series. His first coach was Tibor Török, currently Dániel Bojti has been training him for 6 years.
