= Furkan Yaman =

Turkish footballer

Personal information
- Date of birth: 8 January 1996 (age 30)
- Place of birth: Gaziosmanpaşa, Turkey
- Height: 1.86 m (6 ft 1 in)
- Position: Forward

Team information
- Current team: Arnavutköy Belediyespor

Youth career
- 2005–2008: Gaziosmanpaşaspor
- 2008–2014: Beşiktaş

Senior career*
| Years | Team | Apps | (Gls) |
| 2014–2016 | Beşiktaş | 0 | (0) |
| 2015 | → Menemen Belediyespor (loan) | 9 | (1) |
| 2015–2016 | → Eyüpspor (loan) | 32 | (10) |
| 2016–2017 | Kayserispor | 2 | (0) |
| 2017 | → Nazilli Belediyespor (loan) | 7 | (0) |
| 2017–2018 | Gümüşhanespor | 30 | (10) |
| 2018–2019 | Osmanlıspor | 4 | (0) |
| 2019 | Amed | 25 | (11) |
| 2020–2021 | Sarıyer | 41 | (10) |
| 2021–2022 | Serik Belediyespor | 33 | (15) |
| 2022–2023 | Arnavutköy Belediyespor | 32 | (15) |
| 2023–2024 | Esenler Erokspor | 12 | (7) |
| 2024– | Arnavutköy Belediyespor | 0 | (0) |

International career
| 2011 | Turkey U15 | 1 | (1) |
| 2012 | Turkey U16 | 6 | (3) |
| 2012 | Turkey U17 | 5 | (1) |
| 2014 | Turkey U18 | 3 | (0) |
| 2014 | Turkey U19 | 1 | (0) |
- * Club domestic league appearances and goals as of 26 October 2024

Furkan Yaman (born 8 January 1996) is a Turkish footballer who plays as a forward for TFF Second League club Arnavutköy Belediyespor. He is a product of the Beşiktaş youth academy.

Yaman has represented the Turkish Football Federation at the U15, U16, U17, U18, and U19 levels.
