= Alicja Klasik =

Polish fencer (born 2004)

Personal information
- Nationality: Polish
- Born: 14 February 2004 (age 22) Rybnik, Poland

Fencing career
- Sport: Fencing
- Country: Poland
- Weapon: Épée
- Hand: Left-handed
- National coach: Bartłomiej Język
- Club: RMKS Rybnik
- FIE ranking: current ranking
Medal record
Women's épée
Representing Poland
Olympic Games
Bronze medal – third place	2024 Paris	Team
European Championships
Bronze medal – third place	2026 Antony	Individual

Alicja Klasik (born 14 February 2004) is a Polish épée fencer. She competed in the 2024 Summer Olympics, where she won the bronze medal in the team competition.
