= Anna Spiesz =

Hungarian fencer (born 2005)

Personal information
- Born: 30 July 2005 (age 21)

Fencing career
- Sport: Fencing
- Country: Hungary
- Weapon: Sabre
- Hand: Right-handed
Medal record
Women's sabre
Representing Hungary
World Championships
Gold medal – first place	2026 Hong Kong	Team
World University Games
Silver medal – second place	2025 Rhine-Ruhr	Individual

Anna Spiesz (born 30 July 2005) is a Hungarian right-handed sabre fencer.

== Career ==
In February 2024, Spiesz competed at the 2024 Junior European Fencing Championships and won a gold medal in the team sabre and a silver medal in the individual sabre events. In April 2024, she competed at the 2024 Junior Fencing World Championships and won a bronze medal in the team event.

She represented Hungary at the 2025 Summer World University Games and won a silver medal in the individual sabre event.

She made her World Fencing Championships at the 2026 World Fencing Championships. During the individual sabre event she was eliminated in the round of 64. She also competed in the team sabre event and advanced to the finals. During the final Hungary defeated China to win a gold medal.
