= World Cadets and Juniors Fencing Championships =

FIE fencing competition

- Status: Active
- Frequency: Annual
- Inaugurated: 1950
- Most recent: 2026
- Next event: 2027
- Organiser: International Fencing Federation
- Website: www.fie.ch

The World Cadets and Juniors Fencing Championships are an annual international fencing competition held by the International Fencing Federation.

== History ==
Junior World Fencing Championships for athletes up to 20 years old. Also at the same time and venue as the Cadet World Fencing Championships held for athletes up to 17 years old.

The first Junior World Fencing Championships were held in Nîmes, France in 1950. Team events have been held since 1998. Women compete in foil since 1955, in épée since 1989, and in sabre since 1999.

The first Cadet World Fencing Championships were held in Tel Aviv, Israel in 1987 (Cadets without team events).

Cadet World Fencing Championships and Junior World Fencing Championships were held in two different countries from 1987 to 1992. They have been held simultaneously in one country since 1993.

Share bronze medals in individuals events awarded from 1991.

=== Ages ===
- 17 to 20 : Juniors from 1950
- 14 to 17 : Cadets from 1987

=== Events ===
1. Foil MJ : From 1950 (Team events have been held since 1998)
2. Foil WJ : From 1955 (Team events have been held since 1998)
3. Épée MJ : From 1956 (Team events have been held since 1998)
4. Épée WJ : From 1989 (Team events have been held since 1998)
5. Sabre MJ : From 1952 (Team events have been held since 1998)
6. Saber WJ : From 1999 (Team events have been held since 1999)
7. Foil MC : From 1987 (No Team events)
8. Foil WC : From 1987 (No Team events)
9. Épée MC : From 1987 (No Team events)
10. Épée WC : From 1990 (No Team events)
11. Sabre MC : From 1987 (No Team events)
12. Saber WC : From 1999 (No Team events)
- Note: M=Men / W=Women / J=Juniors / C=Cadets

== Summary ==
Edition	Year	Host City	Host Country	Events
World Juniors Fencing Championships
1	1950	Nice	France	1
2	1951	Paris	France	1
3	1952	Cremona	Italy	2
4	1953	Paris	France	2
5	1954	Paris	France	2
6	1955	Budapest	Hungary	3
7	1956	Luxembourg	Luxembourg	4
8	1957	Warsaw	Poland	4
9	1958	Bucharest	Romania	4
10	1959	Paris	France	4
11	1960	Leningrad	Soviet Union	4
12	1961	Duisburg	West Germany	4
13	1962	Cairo	Egypt	4
14	1963	Ghent	Belgium	4
15	1964	Budapest	Hungary	4
16	1965	Rotterdam	Netherlands	4
17	1966	Vienna	Austria	4
18	1967	Tehran	Iran	4
19	1968	London	United Kingdom	4
20	1969	Genoa	Italy	4
21	1970	Minsk	Soviet Union	4
22	1971	South Bend	United States	4
23	1972	Madrid	Spain	4
24	1973	Buenos Aires	Argentina	4
25	1974	Istanbul	Turkey	4
26	1975	Mexico City	Mexico	4
27	1976	Poznań	Poland	4
28	1977	Vienna	Austria	4
29	1978	Madrid	Spain	4
30	1979	South Bend	United States	4
31	1980	Venice	Italy	4
32	1981	Lausanne	Switzerland	4
33	1982	Buenos Aires	Argentina	4
34	1983	Budapest	Hungary	4
35	1984	Leningrad	Soviet Union	4
36	1985	Arnhem	Netherlands	4
37	1986	Stuttgart	West Germany	4
World Cadets and Juniors Fencing Championships
38	1987	Tel Aviv (C) / São Paulo (J)	Israel (C) / Brazil (J)	8
39	1988	Cabries (C) / South Bend (J)	France (C) / United States (J)	8
40	1989	Lisbon (C) / Athens (J)	Portugal (C) / Greece (J)	9
41	1990	Gothenburg (C) / Mödling (J)	Sweden (C) / Austria (J)	10
42	1991	Foggia (C) / Istanbul (J)	Italy (C) / Turkey (J)	10
43	1992	Bonn (C) / Genoa (J)	Germany (C) / Italy (J)	10
44	1993	Denver	United States	10
45	1994	Mexico City	Mexico	10
46	1995	Paris	France	10
47	1996	Tournai	Belgium	10
48	1997	Tenerife	Spain	10
49	1998	Valencia	Venezuela	15
50	1999	Keszthely	Hungary	18
51	2000	South Bend	United States	18
52	2001	Gdańsk	Poland	18
53	2002	Antalya	Turkey	18
54	2003	Trapani	Italy	18
55	2004	Plovdiv	Bulgaria	18
56	2005	Linz	Austria	18
57	2006	Taebaek	South Korea	18
58	2007	Belek	Turkey	18
59	2008	Acireale	Italy	18
60	2009	Belfast	United Kingdom	18
61	2010	Baku	Azerbaijan	18
62	2011	Dead Sea	Jordan	18
63	2012	Moscow	Russia	18
64	2013	Poreč	Croatia	18
65	2014	Plovdiv	Bulgaria	18
66	2015	Tashkent	Uzbekistan	18
67	2016	Bourges	France	18
68	2017	Plovdiv	Bulgaria	18
69	2018	Verona	Italy	18
70	2019	Toruń	Poland	18
－	2020	Not held		
71	2021	Cairo	Egypt	18
Junior and Cadet Fencing World Championships
72	2022	Dubai	United Arab Emirates	18
73	2023	Plovdiv	Bulgaria	18
74	2024	Riyadh	Saudi Arabia	18
75	2025	Wuxi	China	18
76	2026	Rio de Janeiro	Brazil	18
77	2027	Ankara	Turkey	18

== See also ==
- World Fencing Championships
- European Cadets and Juniors Fencing Championships
- Asian Cadets and Juniors Fencing Championships
