= European Fencing Confederation =

Fencing governing body in Europe

- Confédération Européenne d'Escrime
- Abbreviation: EFC / CEE
- Formation: 26 October 1991; 34 years ago
- Founded at: Vienna, Austria
- Type: Sports governing body
- Headquarters: Luxembourg
- Region served: Europe
- Official language: English, French
- President: Pascal Tesch
- Vice-President: Etienne Van Cann
- Secretary General: Jacek Słupski
- Treasurer: Nuala McGarrity
- Affiliations: Fédération Internationale d'Escrime (FIE)
- Website: www.fencing-efc.eu

The European Fencing Confederation (EFC; French: Confédération Européenne d'Escrime, CEE) is the continental governing body for fencing in Europe. Founded on 26 October 1991 in Vienna, Austria, it is the European continental confederation within the Fédération Internationale d'Escrime (FIE).

The EFC organises European fencing championships and competition circuits at senior, under-23, junior, cadet and other age levels. Its activities also include technical cooperation between national federations and the development of coaching and refereeing.

The Confederation has its headquarters associated with the Luxembourg Fencing Federation, while its General Secretariat is based in Warsaw, Poland.

== History ==
=== Foundation and development ===
The organisation was founded in Vienna on 26 October 1991 under the French name Union Européenne d'Escrime. The English name subsequently became predominant.

The EFC was established to promote and develop fencing in Europe, facilitate technical cooperation between national federations, coordinate and improve fencing education and represent European fencing before European institutions.

The Confederation subsequently expanded its competition programme beyond the senior European Championships. Its activities include the European Cadet Circuit and competitions at under-23 level.

=== Governance changes from 2022 ===
Following the departure of Stanislav Pozdnyakov as president in 2022, a consequence of the Invasion of Ukraine by Russia, an Extraordinary Congress was held in Warsaw on 1 October 2022 to elect a successor. Giorgio Scarso of Italy was elected president, defeating Nikolay Mateev of Iceland by 24 votes to 20.

At its Congress in Kraków on 24 June 2023, the EFC approved two proposals submitted by the Ukrainian Fencing Federation. The decisions barred athletes, coaches and officials holding Russian or Belarusian citizenship and licences from EFC competitions and suspended the membership of the Russian and Belarusian fencing federations.

At the Ordinary and Elective Congress in Budapest on 14 September 2024, Luxembourg's Pascal Tesch was elected president of the EFC. Three candidates contested the first round: Tesch, Marius Florea of Romania and Ana Valero-Collantes of Sweden. Tesch defeated Florea 22–20 in the second round.

In June 2026, the EFC Executive Committee provisionally readmitted the Russian and Belarusian fencing federations. The EFC described the measure as a provisional readmission.

== Organisation and governance ==
The EFC is governed through its Congress and Executive Committee, together with a Bureau and specialised commissions and councils.

Between meetings of Congress, the Executive Committee is responsible for the governance and administration of the Confederation. According to the EFC, it implements decisions of Congress, oversees sporting, organisational and financial activities, adopts and supervises annual plans, monitors the budget and directs the work of the Bureau and permanent commissions.

The Executive Committee consists of the president and nine elected members. Following the 2024 elections and subsequent appointments, the senior officers are:

- President: Pascal Tesch (Luxembourg)
- Vice-President: Etienne Van Cann (Netherlands)
- Secretary General: Jacek Słupski (Poland)
- Treasurer: Nuala McGarrity (Ireland)

The elected members include Martina Zmaic, Nikolay Ivanov Mateev, Lucia Martín-Portugués Barbero, Vilem Madr, Hilary Philbin, Zsolt Csampa and Vincenzo de Bartolomeo.

The Confederation also operates specialised commissions and councils. These deal with areas including competition, refereeing, coaching and education, athletes and legal affairs. The Legal Commission, for example, reviews proposals relating to the EFC Statutes and Internal Rules and provides legal support to the Confederation.

== Competitions ==
The EFC organises and supervises European championships and a number of European competition circuits.

=== European Championships ===
The principal championship levels include:

- Senior European Championships
- European Under-23 Fencing Championships
- European Junior Fencing Championships
- European Cadet Fencing Championships
- The U14 Festival

The championships include competitions in épée, foil and sabre, with men's and women's events.

=== European circuits ===
The EFC operates competition circuits at several age levels. The European Cadet Circuit provides international competitions for cadet fencers in épée, foil and sabre, while a separate circuit operates at under-23 level.

The EFC also operates an under-14 European competition programme. Its competition calendar includes under-14 circuit competitions.

=== Eurofence League ===
The Eurofence League is an EFC competition series open across age categories. It forms part of the EFC competition calendar alongside the senior, under-23, junior, cadet and under-14 programmes.

Eurofence League competitions are organised in different European countries and across the three fencing weapons.

== Member federations ==
The EFC's public membership directory lists 42 national fencing federations, including Israel.

- Armenia
- Austria
- Azerbaijan
- Belgium
- Bulgaria
- Croatia
- Cyprus
- Czechia
- Denmark
- Estonia
- Finland
- France
- Georgia
- Germany
- Great Britain
- Greece
- Hungary
- Iceland
- Ireland
- Israel
- Italy
- Latvia
- Lithuania
- Luxembourg
- Malta
- Moldova
- Monaco
- Montenegro
- Netherlands
- North Macedonia
- Norway
- Poland
- Portugal
- Romania
- Serbia
- Slovakia
- Slovenia
- Spain
- Sweden
- Switzerland
- Türkiye
- Ukraine

The status of the Russian and Belarusian fencing federations has changed since 2023. Both federations were suspended by the EFC Congress in June 2023. In June 2026, the EFC announced their provisional readmission.

== Presidents ==
The EFC lists the following succession of presidents on its official history page:

Period	President	Federation
1992	Rainer Mauritz	Austria
1992–1996	Gen. Joaquim Chito Rodrigues	Portugal
1996–2005	Jenő Kamuti	Hungary
2005–2008	Alisher Usmanov	Russia
2008–2016	František Janda	Czech Republic
2016–2022	Stanislav Pozdnyakov	Russia
2022–2024	Giorgio Scarso	Italy
2024–present	Pascal Tesch	Luxembourg

== Russia and Belarus ==
Following the Russian invasion of Ukraine in February 2022, the status of Russian and Belarusian fencing became a significant issue within European and international fencing.

In 2022, Stanislav Pozdnyakov ceased to hold the EFC presidency. An Extraordinary Congress in Warsaw on 1 October 2022 elected Giorgio Scarso of Italy as his successor by 24 votes to 20 over Nikolay Mateev of Iceland.

On 24 June 2023, the EFC Congress in Kraków approved two proposals submitted by the Ukrainian Fencing Federation. The first excluded athletes, coaches and officials holding Russian or Belarusian citizenship and licences from EFC competitions. The second suspended the EFC membership of the Russian and Belarusian fencing federations.

In June 2026, the status changed again when the EFC Executive Committee provisionally readmitted the Belarusian and Russian fencing federations. The decision was announced in EFC Information Letter 19/2026 on 25 June 2026. Contemporary reporting stated that the proposals were approved by 23 votes to 10 among the 43 member federations represented in the process.

In June 2026, the status changed again when the EFC Executive Committee provisionally readmitted the Belarusian and Russian fencing federations. The decision was announced in EFC Information Letter 19/2026 on 25 June 2026.

== See also ==
- Fédération Internationale d'Escrime
- European Fencing Championships
- Fencing at the European Games
- Fencing
