= Ukraine at the 2021 Summer World University Games =

- Flag of Ukraine
- IOC code: UKR

in Chengdu, China 28 July 2023 – 8 August 2023
- Competitors: 71 (35 men and 26 women) in 10 sports
- Medals Ranked 13th: Gold 4 Silver 4 Bronze 3 Total 11

Summer Universiade appearances (overview)
- 1993; 1995; 1997; 1999; 2001; 2003; 2005; 2007; 2009; 2011; 2013; 2015; 2017; 2019; 2021; 2025; 2027

Ukraine competed at the 2021 Summer World University Games in Chengdu, China, that was held from 28 July to 8 August 2023. Ukraine did not compete in basketball, diving, rowing, shooting, swimming, table tennis, tennis, and water polo.

== Medal summary ==
=== Medal by sports ===
Medals by sport
Sport	1st place, gold medalist(s)	2nd place, silver medalist(s)	3rd place, bronze medalist(s)	Total
Rhythmic gymnastics	2	2	1	5
Athletics	1	1	1	3
Artistic gymnastics	1	0	0	1
Fencing	0	1	0	1
Taekwondo	0	0	1	1
Total	4	4	3	11

=== Medalists ===
Medal	Name	Sport	Event	Date
Gold	Khrystyna Pohranychna	Rhythmic gymnastics	Hoop	31 July
Gold	Khrystyna Pohranychna	Rhythmic gymnastics	Ribbon	31 July
Gold	Vladyslav Lavskyi	Athletics	Men's high jump	3 August
Gold	Nazar Chepurnyi	Artistic gymnastics	Men's vault	5 August
Silver	Khrystyna Pohranychna	Rhythmic gymnastics	Individual all-around	30 July
Silver	Marta Borys; Diana Dovganiuk; Dariia Ivanyk; Nikol Krasiuk; Anastasiia Ptashnyk; Daria Shcherbakova	Rhythmic gymnastics	Group all-around	30 July
Silver	Yan Sych	Fencing	Men's individual épée	3 August
Silver	Yuliya Loban	Athletics	Women's heptathlon	5 August
Bronze	Marta Borys; Diana Dovganiuk; Dariia Ivanyk; Anastasiia Ptashnyk; Nikol Krasiuk	Rhythmic gymnastics	5 Hoops	31 July
Bronze	Andrii Harbar	Taekwondo	Men's +87 kg	2 August
Bronze	Roman Petruk	Athletics	Men's high jump	3 August

== Competitors ==
Sport	Men	Women	Total
Archery	2	2	4
Artistic gymnastics	4	—	4
Athletics	4	3	7
Badminton	2	2	4
Fencing	4	7	11
Judo	3	2	5
Rhythmic gymnastics	—	7	7
Taekwondo	3	2	5
Volleyball	12	–	12
Wushu	1	1	2
Total	35	26	71

== Archery ==
Recurve

Athlete	Event	Ranking round		Round of 48	Round of 24	Round of 16	Quarterfinals	Semifinals	Final / BM	
Athlete	Event	Score	Seed	Opposition Score	Opposition Score	Opposition Score	Opposition Score	Opposition Score	Opposition Score	Rank
Stefan Kostyk	Men's individual	623	40	Bye	Alimbayev (KAZ); L 5–6	Did not advance				
Solomiya Trapeznikova	Women's individual	612	28	—	Zaemova (KAZ); L 0–6	Did not advance				
Olha Shubkina	Women's individual	610	30	—	Poon (HKG); L 4–6	Did not advance				
Stefan Kostyk; Solomiya Trapeznikova	Mixed team	1235	15	—		Moldova; L 3–5	Did not advance			

Compound

Athlete	Event	Ranking round		Round of 24	Round of 16	Quarterfinals	Semifinals	Final / BM	
Athlete	Event	Score	Seed	Opposition Score	Opposition Score	Opposition Score	Opposition Score	Opposition Score	Rank
Roman Hoviadovskyi	Men's individual	640	38	Boggiatto (ITA); L 136–141	Did not advance				

== Artistic gymnastics ==
Men
Team all-around

Athlete	Event	Apparatus						Total	Rank
Athlete	Event	F	PH	R	V	PB	HB	Total	Rank
Nazar Chepurnyi	Team all-around	12.900	~~10.833~~	13.266	14.533	13.666	12.966	235.826	11
Pantely Kolodii	Team all-around	12.666	13.600	13.533	13.333	13.166	12.733	235.826	11
Mykyta Melnykov	Team all-around	13.033	12.333	~~12.066~~	13.633	~~12.133~~	~~10.966~~	235.826	11
Bohdan Suprun	Team all-around	~~10.833~~	12.000	13.466	~~13.033~~	13.033	11.966	235.826	11

Individual all-around

Athlete	Event	Qualification								Final							
Athlete	Event	Apparatus						Total	Rank	Apparatus						Total	Rank
Athlete	Event	F	PH	R	V	PB	HB	Total	Rank	F	PH	R	V	PB	HB	Total	Rank
Nazar Chepurnyi	Individual all-around	12.900	10.833	13.266	14.533	13.666	12.966	78.164	24 R3	Did not qualify							
Pantely Kolodii	Individual all-around	12.666	13.600	13.533	13.333	13.166	12.733	79.031	20 Q	12.600	13.633	13.433	13.166	13.366	12.833	79.031	15
Mykyta Melnykov	Individual all-around	13.033	12.333	12.066	13.633	12.133	10.966	74.164	46	Did not qualify							
Bohdan Suprun	Individual all-around	10.833	12.000	13.466	13.033	13.033	11.966	74.331	43	Did not qualify							

Individual apparatus finals

Athlete	Event	Total	Rank
Nazar Chepurnyi	Vault	14.883	1st place, gold medalist(s)

== Athletics ==
Key

- Note–Ranks given for track events are within the athlete's heat only
- Q = Qualified for the next round
- q = Qualified for the next round as a fastest loser or, in field events, by position without achieving the qualifying target
- NR = National record
- N/A = Round not applicable for the event
- Bye = Athlete not required to compete in round

Field events
Men

Athlete	Event	Qualification		Final	
Athlete	Event	Distance	Position	Distance	Position
Roman Petruk	High jump	2.20	1 q	2.20	3rd place, bronze medalist(s)
Vladyslav Lavskyi	High jump	2.20	=7 q	2.25 PB	1st place, gold medalist(s)
Mykhailo Havryliuk	Hammer throw	70.90	1 q	71.59	5
Hlib Piskunov	Hammer throw	70.86	2 q	72.19 SB	4

Women

Athlete	Event	Qualification		Final	
Athlete	Event	Distance	Position	Distance	Position
Olena Khamaza	Hammer throw	62.43	5 q	64.97 SB	5
Erika Lukach	Javelin throw	47.71	14	Did not advance	

Combined events – Women's heptathlon

Athlete	Event	100H	HJ	SP	200 m	LJ	JT	800 m	Final	Rank
Yuliia Loban	Result	13.92	1.77	14.27	25.12	5.90	44.33	2:16.32	6063	2nd place, silver medalist(s)
Yuliia Loban	Points	990	941	812	876	819	751	874	6063	2nd place, silver medalist(s)

== Badminton ==
Ukraine did not compete in mixed doubles.

Singles and doubles

Athlete	Event	Round of 64	Round of 32	Round of 16	Quarterfinal	Semifinal	Final / BM	
Athlete	Event	Opposition Score	Opposition Score	Opposition Score	Opposition Score	Opposition Score	Opposition Score	Rank
Volodymyr Koluzaiev	Men's singles	Musonda (ZAM); W 2–0 (21–5, 21–5)	Roy (FRA); L 0–2 (7–21, 16–21)	Did not advance				
Viacheslav Yakovlev	Men's singles	Szymanowski (POL); L 1–2 (25–23, 16–21, 14–21)	Did not advance					
Anastasiia Yerokhina	Women's singles	Cloteaux-Foucault (FRA); L 0–2 (17–21, 12–21)	Did not advance					
Mariia Stoliarenko	Women's singles	Bye	Han (CHN); L 0–2 (12–21, 10–21)	Did not advance				
Volodymyr Koluzaiev; Viacheslav Yakovlev	Men's doubles	Berik / Ounmaa (EST); L 1–2 (19–21, 26–24, 20–22)	Did not advance					
Mariia Stoliarenko; Anastasiia Yerokhina	Women's doubles	Bye	Kurihara / Uchida (JPN); L 1–2 (11–21, 15–21)	Did not advance				

Mixed team

Team	Event	Group stage					Quarterfinals	Semifinals	Final / BM	
Team	Event	Opposition Score	Opposition Score	Opposition Score	Opposition Score	Rank	Opposition Score	Opposition Score	Opposition Score	Rank
Viacheslav Yakovlev; Volodymyr Koluzaiev; Mariia Stoliarenko; Anastasiia Yerokhina	Mixed team	South Korea; L 0–5	Switzerland; L 1–4	India; L 0–5	Japan; L 0–5	5	Did not advance			

- Group stage

30 July 2023	South Korea	5 – 0	Ukraine

Kim Young-hyuk / Lee Jung-hyun	2–0	Volodymyr Koluzaiev / Anastasiia Yerokhina	21–8, 21–10
Jeong Min-seon	2–0	Viacheslav Yakovlev	21–7, 21–16
Kim Ga-ram	2–0	Mariia Stoliarenko	21–7, 21–16
In Seok-hyun / Na Gwang-min	2–0	Viacheslav Yakovlev / Volodymyr Koluzaiev	21–5, 21–13
An Hye-won / Bahng Ju-yeong	2–0	Mariia Stoliarenko / Anastasiia Yerokhina	21–19, 21–9

31 July 2023	Switzerland	4 – 1	Ukraine

Arthur Boudier / Caroline Deborah Racloz	2–0	Volodymyr Koluzaiev / Anastasiia Yerokhina	21–12, 21–11
Julian Scheiwiller	2–0	Viacheslav Yakovlev	21–15, 21–12
Milena Schnider	2–0	Mariia Stoliarenko	21–11, 21–15
Arthur Boudier / Minh Quang Pham	2–0	Viacheslav Yakovlev / Volodymyr Koluzaiev	21–15, 21–15
Aline Laetitia Muller / Caroline Deborah Racloz	1–2	Mariia Stoliarenko / Anastasiia Yerokhina	21–19, 23–25, 17–21

31 July 2023	India	5 – 0	Ukraine

Viraj Vilas Kuvale / Swetaparna Panda	2–0	Volodymyr Koluzaiev / Mariia Stoliarenko	21–18, 21–8
Arya Nitin Bhivpathaki	2–0	Viacheslav Yakovlev	21–10, 21–11
Taneesha Singh	2–0	Anastasiia Yerokhina	21–17, 21–10
Deep Rohit Rambhiya / Viraj Vilas Kuvale	2–0	Viacheslav Yakovlev / Volodymyr Koluzaiev	21–15, 21–16
Rutaparna Panda / Swetaparna Panda	2–0	Mariia Stoliarenko / Anastasiia Yerokhina	21–7, 21–13

1 August 2023	Japan	5 – 0	Ukraine

Naoya Kawashima / Machi Nagasako	2–0	Volodymyr Koluzaiev / Mariia Stoliarenko	21–13, 21–16
Toma Noda	2–0	Viacheslav Yakovlev	21–11, 21–15
Miu Uchida	2–0	Anastasiia Yerokhina	21–7, 21–15
Shuta Machida / Kakeru Kumagai	2–0	Viacheslav Yakovlev / Volodymyr Koluzaiev	21–12, 21–15
Moe Aoki / Rio Uemura	2–0	Mariia Stoliarenko / Anastasiia Yerokhina	21–10, 21–18

== Fencing ==
Athlete	Event	Preliminary round	Round of 64	Round of 32	Round of 16	Quarterfinal	Semifinal	Final / BM	
Athlete	Event	Rank	Opposition Score	Opposition Score	Opposition Score	Opposition Score	Opposition Score	Opposition Score	Rank
Yan Sych	Men's épée	7 Q	Akhtamov (UZB); W 15–9	Gaetani (ITA); W 15–14	Erbetta (SUI); W 15–12	Mencarelli (ITA); W 15–7	Midelton (FRA); W 15–11	Jean-Joseph (FRA); L 13–15	2nd place, silver medalist(s)
Andrii Opanasenko	Men's épée	32 Q	Kwon (KOR); L 12–15	Did not advance					
Yevhenii Horbachuk	Men's épée	36 Q	Biro (AUT); L 9–15	Did not advance					
Nikita Koshman	Men's épée	43 Q	Eskov (EST); L 13–14	Did not advance					
Yan Sych; Andrii Opanasenko; Yevhenii Horbachuk; Nikita Koshman	Team épée	—	—	Bye	United States; W 45–40	Hungary; L 39–40	Japan; W 45–24	Poland; L 44–45	6
Yeva Mazur	Women's épée	21 Q	Rakhimova (UZB); W 11–10	Nikolaichuk (KAZ); W 15–5	Hsieh (HKG); L 2–3	Did not advance			
Polina Kuleshova	Women's épée	25 Q	Praxmarer (AUT); L 7–15	Did not advance					
Daryna Zabolotna	Women's épée	51 Q	Xu (CHN); L 7–15	Did not advance					
Yeva Mazur; Polina Kuleshova; Daryna Zabolotna	Team épée	—	—	Bye	Poland; W 45–36	Italy; L 23–45	France; L 31–45	United States; L 37–45	8
Olha Sopit	Women's foil	10 Q	Bye	Jeglińska (POL); W 15–9	Kano (JPN); L 13–15	Did not advance			
Dariia Myroniuk	Women's foil	17 Q	Bye	Kuan (HKG); W 15–8	Qingyuan (CHN); L 7–15	Did not advance			
Alina Poloziuk	Women's foil	28 Q	Vinayakam Paranjothi (IND); W 15–4	Tangherlini (ITA); L 8–15	Did not advance				
Olha Sopit; Dariia Myroniuk; Alina Poloziuk	Team foil	—	—	—	Bye	China; L 22–45	Hong Kong; L 37–45	Poland; W 45–31	7

== Judo ==
Men

Athlete	Event	Round of 32	Round of 16	Quarterfinals	Repechage	Semifinals	Final / BM	
Athlete	Event	Opposition Result	Opposition Result	Opposition Result	Opposition Result	Opposition Result	Opposition Result	Rank
Kyryl Samotug	−60 kg	Tîrsînă (MDA); W 10–00	Bouda (FRA); L 00–10	Did not advance				
Mykhailo Svidrak	−81 kg	Bedel (ITA); L 00–11	Did not advance					
Zaur Duniamaliiev	−100 kg	Bulthuis (NED); L 00–10	Did not advance					

Women

Athlete	Event	Round of 32	Round of 16	Quarterfinals	Repechage	Semifinals	Final / BM	
Athlete	Event	Opposition Result	Opposition Result	Opposition Result	Opposition Result	Opposition Result	Opposition Result	Rank
Anastaiia Antipina	−63 kg	Yuan (TPE); W 01–00	Yamaguchi (JPN); L 00–10	Did not advance				
Anna Kazakova	−78 kg	Bye	Dudėnaitė (LTU); L 00–01	Did not advance				

== Rhythmic gymnastics ==
Individual all-round

Athlete	Event	Hoop	Ball	Clubs	Ribbon	Total	Rank
Khrystyna Pohranychna	All-around	32.350	31.250	30.300	28.400	122.300	2nd place, silver medalist(s)

Individual apparatus

Athlete	Event	Qualification		Final	
Athlete	Event	Total	Rank	Total	Rank
Khrystyna Pohranychna	Hoop	32.350	2 Q	32.200	1st place, gold medalist(s)
Khrystyna Pohranychna	Ball	31.250	4 Q	31.350	4
Khrystyna Pohranychna	Clubs	30.300	4 Q	30.350	6
Khrystyna Pohranychna	Ribbon	28.400	5 Q	29.300	1st place, gold medalist(s)

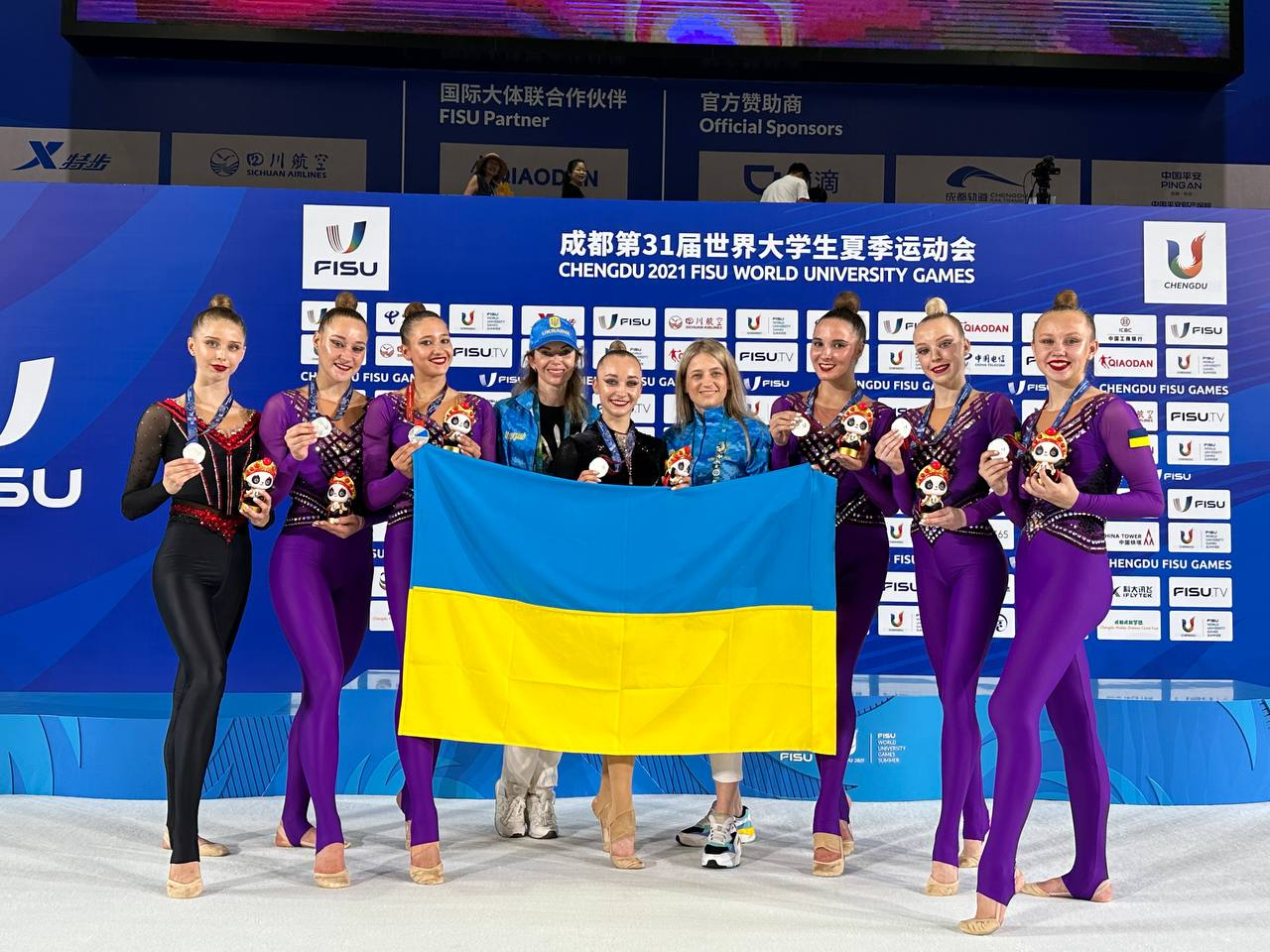
Team Ukraine at the 2021 Summer World University Games

Group all-round

Ivanyk competed in the 5 hoops event and Karsiuk in the 3 ribbons and 2 balls event.

Athletes	Event	5 hoops	3 ribbons + 2 balls	Total	Rank
Diana Dovganiuk; Marta Borys; Daria Shcherbakova; Anastasiia Ptashnyk; Dariia Ivanyk; Nikol Krasiuk	All-around	30.350	26.250	56.600	2nd place, silver medalist(s)

Group separate programms

Athletes	Event	Qualification		Final	
Athletes	Event	Total	Rank	Total	Rank
Diana Dovganiuk; Marta Borys; Nikol Krasiuk; Anastasiia Ptashnyk; Dariia Ivanyk	5 Hoops	30.350	2 Q	27.800	3rd place, bronze medalist(s)
Diana Dovganiuk; Marta Borys; Daria Shcherbakova; Anastasiia Ptashnyk; Nikol Krasiuk	3 Ribbons + 2 Balls	26.250	2 Q	22.750	4

== Taekwondo ==
Men

Athlete	Event	Round of 32	Round of 16	Quarterfinals	Semifinals	Final	
Athlete	Event	Opposition Result	Opposition Result	Opposition Result	Opposition Result	Opposition Result	Rank
Volodymyr Bystrov	−63 kg	Bye	Duisenov (KAZ); L 0–2	Did not advance			
Oleh Mamatov	−68 kg	Aksas (ALG); W 2–0	Diniz (BRA); L 0–2	Did not advance			
Andrii Harbar	+87 kg	—	Bye	Choi (USA); W 2–0	Jung (TPE); L 0–2	Did not advance	3rd place, bronze medalist(s)

Women

Athlete	Event	Round of 32	Round of 16	Quarterfinals	Semifinals	Final / BM	
Athlete	Event	Opposition Result	Opposition Result	Opposition Result	Opposition Result	Opposition Result	Rank
Mariia Labuzova	−62 kg	Bye	Liu (CHN); L 0–2	Did not advance			
Renata Podolian	−73 kg	Bye	Ble (FRA); L 0–2	Did not advance			

== Volleyball ==
Both men's and women's teams were selected to compete at the Games. Ukraine decided to withdraw from the women's tournament. The team was initially seeded for Group with Japan, Colombia, and Australia (also withdrew and was substituted with the Czech Republic).

Men

- Heorhii Klepko
- Ivan Kryvobok
- Bohdan Mazenko
- Serhii Mishchenko
- Volodymyr Ostapenko
- Yaroslav Pampushko
- Serhii Riabov
- Andrii Stebletskyi
- Yevhenii Stepovyi
- Danylo Uryvkin
- Denys Veletskyi
- Dmytro Yanchuk

Team	Event	Group stage				Quarterfinals	Semifinals / 5-8 SF	Final / Pl. m.	
Team	Event	Opposition Score	Opposition Score	Opposition Score	Rank	Opposition Score	Opposition Score	Opposition Score	Rank
Ukraine	Men's tournament	Azerbaijan; W 3–0 (25–21, 25–20, 25–21)	China; L 0–3 (20–25, 18–25, 9–25)	Japan; W 3–1 (25–23, 20–25, 25–20, 25–20)	2 Q	Poland; L 0–3 (20–25, 16–25, 19–25)	Germany; L 0–3 (18–25, 22–25, 14–25)	Portugal; L 2–3 (23–25, 19–25, 25–18, 25–23, 10–15)	8

== Wushu ==
Changquan

Athlete	Event	Score	Rank
Oleksii Kolisnyk	Men's	9.410	10

Taijiquan

Athlete	Event	Score	Rank
Oryna Ivanova	Women's	9.303	10

Taijijian

Athlete	Event	Score	Rank
Oryna Ivanova	Women's	9.630	6
