= Gymnastics at the 2021 Summer World University Games – Women's rhythmic individual all-around =

Women's individual all-around at the Chengdu 2021 FISU World University Games
- Venue: Chengdu Sport University Gymnasium
- Dates: 29-31 July
- Competitors: 31 from 22 nations

Medalists
1st place, gold medalist(s)		Fanni Pigniczki	Hungary
2nd place, silver medalist(s)		Khrystyna Pohranychna	Ukraine
3rd place, bronze medalist(s)		Reina Matsusaka	Japan

The women's individual all-around gymnastics event at the 2021 Summer Universiade was held from July 29 to August 30 at the Chengdu Sport University Gymnasium in Chengdu, China.

== Final results ==
Qualified for the apparatus final
Reserve for the apparatus final

Rank	Athletic	Hoop (rhythmic gymnastics)		Ball (rhythmic gymnastics)		Clubs (rhythmic gymnastics)		Ribbon (rhythmic gymnastics)		Total (All-around)
Rank	Athletic	Score	Rank	Score	Rank	Score	Rank	Score	Rank	Score
1st place, gold medalist(s)	Fanni Pigniczki (HUN)	33.250	1	32.350	1	31.650	1	29.550	2	126.800
2nd place, silver medalist(s)	Khrystyna Pohranychna (UKR)	32.350	2	31.250	4	30.300	4	28.400	5	122.300
3rd place, bronze medalist(s)	Reina Matsusaka (JPN)	30.350	6	30.500	6	29.300	8	29.950	1	120.100
4	Naruha Suzuki (JPN)	31.700	4	29.850	9	29.350	7	28.150	6	119.050
5	Elzhana Taniyeva (KAZ)	30.250	7	30.500	5	28.000	11	29.350	3	118.100
6	Zohra Aghamirova (AZE)	32.200	3	28.000	12	30.000	5	27.900	8	118.100
7	Li Huilin (CHN)	31.450	5	31.450	2	27.350	13	27.300	10	117.550
8	Tatyana Volozhanina (BUL)	28.250	14	31.250	3	30.500	2	26.450	12	116.450
9	Aibota Yertaikyzy (KAZ)	28.300	13	30.200	8	28.950	10	28.800	4	116.250
10	Andreea Verdes (ROU)	29.650	8	27.600	16	29.600	6	28.150	7	115.000
11	Zhao Yue (CHN)	27.200	17	29.700	10	30.500	3	27.350	9	114.750
12	Lachezara Pekova (BUL)	28.450	10	30.400	7	29.250	9	26.100	13	114.200
13	Brigita Krasovec (SLO)	28.750	9	28.600	11	26.850	15	24.150	18	108.350
14	Ilona Zeynalova (AZE)	27.000	18	27.250	17	27.700	16	26.650	11	107.600
15	Elisabeth Lolav Jamil (FIN)	28.400	11	27.750	15	25.100	20	26.050	14	107.300
16	Adelina Beljajeva (EST)	26.800	19	27.000	18	27.250	14	25.750	15	106.800
17	Kim Joowon (KOR)	26.550	16	27.950	13	27.850	12	23.200	20	106.550
18	Maria Dervisi (GRE)	28.300	12	24.700	22	25.600	19	24.300	17	102.900
19	Jun Yeojin (KOR)	26.200	20	26.900	14	24.750	21	22.800	23	101.650
20	Emilia Elionoora Helin (FIN)	25.650	22	25.100	21	25.800	18	23.650	19	100.200
21	Denisa Stepankova (CZE)	27.600	15	26.300	20	23.850	22	22.300	24	100.050
22	Anna Murikova (LAT)	25.650	22	26.400	19	22.300	24	25.350	16	99.700
23	Lana Sambol (CRO)	25.100	23	24.000	25	25.950	17	20.400	28	95.450
24	Azra Dewan (RSA)	25.000	24	24.600	23	21.200	25	23.000	21	93.800
25	Marie-anett Kaasik (EST)	23.750	25	24.100	24	19.850	29	22.150	25	89.850
26	Martina Gil (ARG)	23.450	26	21.850	28	20.600	28	22.950	22	88.850
27	Catherine Amelia Jane Lyndon (AUS)	21.550	27	21.750	29	23.450	23	20.500	27	87.250
28	Lages Madalena (POR)	21.200	28	22.950	27	18.750	30	21.500	26	84.400
29	Nastja Podvratnik (SLO)	19.300	30	21.150	26	21.150	26	18.100	30	82.000
30	Angeline Qihong Lin (SGP)	17.100	31	21.700	30	21.100	27	15.800	31	75.700
31	Giorgia Ying Li Chin (AUS)	20.900	29	18.800	31	16.950	31	18.950	29	76.600
