= Gymnastics at the 2021 Summer World University Games – Women's rhythmic individual hoop =

Women's individual all-around at the Chengdu 2021 FISU World University Games
- Venue: Chengdu Sport University Gymnasium
- Dates: 29–31 July
- Competitors: 31 from 22 nations

Medalists
1st place, gold medalist(s)		Khrystyna Pohranychna	Ukraine
2nd place, silver medalist(s)		Zohra Aghamirova	Azerbaijan
3rd place, bronze medalist(s)		Elzhana Taniyeva	Kazakhstan

The women's individual hoop final gymnastics event at the 2021 Summer World University Games was held on July 31, 2023, at the Chengdu Sport University Gymnasium in Chengdu, China.

== Schedule ==
All times are Taiwan Standard Time (UTC+06:00).

Date	Time	Event
Sunday, 31 July 2023	14:00	Final

== Results ==
Rank	Athlete	Score				Total
Rank	Athlete	D Score	E Score	E Score	Pen.	Total
1st place, gold medalist(s)	Khrystyna Pohranychna (UKR)	16.700	7.900	7.600		32.200
2nd place, silver medalist(s)	Zohra Aghamirova (AZE)	16.000	8.150	7.650		31.800
3rd place, bronze medalist(s)	Elzhana Taniyeva (KAZ)	15.600	7.900	7.800		31.300
4	Huilin Li (CHN)	15.500	7.850	7.650		31.000
5	Naruha Suzuki (JPN)	15.400	8.000	7.500		30.900
6	Reina Matsusaka (JPN)	14.400	8.250	7.550		30.200
7	Fanni Pigniczki (HUN)	14.000	7.950	7.100		29.050
8	Andreea Verdes (ROU)	14.100	7.550	7.350		29.000
