= 2015 World Youth Championships in Athletics – Boys' hammer throw =

Boys' hammer throw at the 2015 World Youth Championships in Athletics
- Venue: Estadio Olímpico Pascual Guerrero
- Dates: 16–17 July
- Competitors: 23 from 17 nations
- Winning distance: 84.91

Medalists
gold medal	Hlib Piskunov	Ukraine
silver medal	Mykhailo Havryliuk	Ukraine
bronze medal	Ned Weatherly	Australia

The boys' hammer throw at the 2015 World Youth Championships in Athletics was held at the Estadio Olímpico Pascual Guerrero in Cali, Colombia from 16 to 17 July 2015.

== Records ==
Prior to the competition, the following records were as follows.

World Youth Best	Bence Halász (HUN)	87.16	Baku, Azerbaijan	31 May 2014
Championship Record	Bence Pásztor (HUN)	82.60	Lille, France	8 July 2011
World Youth Leading	Hlib Piskunov (UKR)	84.56	Kyiv, Ukraine	22 May 2015

== Results ==
=== Qualification ===
With qualifying standard of 72.00 (Q) or at least the 12 best performers (q) advance to the final.

Rank	Group	Name	Nationality	1	2	3	Mark	Notes
1	A	Hlib Piskunov	Ukraine	82.10			82.10	Q
2	B	Mykhailo Havryliuk	Ukraine	78.65			78.65	Q, PB
3	B	Ned Weatherly	Australia	x	77.49		77.49	Q
4	A	Péter Szentivánszky	Hungary	74.91			74.91	Q
5	B	Jake Norris	Great Britain	73.82			73.82	Q
6	A	Alberto González	Spain	73.11			73.11	Q, PB
7	B	Mihăiță Micu	Romania	x	70.54	72.89	72.89	Q, PB
8	A	Aliaksandr Shymanovich	Belarus	67.92	72.78		72.78	Q
9	A	Robert Colantonio	United States	70.69	72.69		72.69	Q
10	B	Radosław Sikora	Poland	71.53	66.57	67.74	71.53	q, PB
11	B	Dániel Rába	Hungary	70.52	x	x	70.52	q
12	B	Marc Okun	Germany	x	69.03	x	69.03	q
13	B	Daniil Danilov	Russia	x	67.08	69.02	69.02	
14	A	Xu Wenjie	China	x	68.05	x	68.05	
15	B	Marc Liébana	Spain	67.46	x	64.83	67.46	
16	A	Alejandro Medina	Paraguay	x	67.46	x	67.46	PB
17	A	Roberto Montiel	Chile	66.75	66.58	x	66.75	
18	A	Ashish Jakhar	India	66.62	x	x	66.62	
19	B	Meraj Ali	India	66.35	66.19	66.16	66.35	
20	A	Patrik Hájek	Czech Republic	61.87	65.73	x	65.73	
21	A	Hakan Mert Sözüdiri	Turkey	65.25	x	x	65.25	
22	A	Alexandru Bilan	Romania	62.31	61.75	x	62.31	
–	B	Felipe Cortés	Chile	x	x	x	NM	

=== Final ===
Rank	Name	Nationality	1	2	3	4	5	6	Mark	Notes
1st place, gold medalist(s)	Hlib Piskunov	Ukraine	83.19	84.91	76.50	83.70	77.35	81.10	84.91	CR
2nd place, silver medalist(s)	Mykhailo Havryliuk	Ukraine	71.54	77.87	73.98	78.93	72.29	x	78.93	PB
3rd place, bronze medalist(s)	Ned Weatherly	Australia	77.00	77.57	76.04	77.60	x	77.18	77.60	
4	Péter Szentivánszky	Hungary	76.65	74.26	x	68.92	x	73.78	76.65	
5	Robert Colantonio	United States	72.18	x	70.60	67.34	71.84	73.79	73.79	
6	Aliaksandr Shymanovich	Belarus	70.09	73.05	x	x	72.43	65.36	73.05	
7	Jake Norris	Great Britain	72.58	70.21	x	67.36	68.49	69.28	72.58	
8	Marc Okun	Germany	x	68.69	71.21	68.21	67.17	x	71.21	
9	Alberto González	Spain	71.18	x	68.27				71.18	
10	Dániel Rába	Hungary	x	x	69.96				69.96	
11	Mihăiță Micu	Romania	68.70	69.59	68.50				69.59	
12	Radosław Sikora	Poland	x	67.66	x				67.66	
