= Athletics at the 2021 Summer World University Games – Men's hammer throw =

The men's hammer throw event at the 2021 Summer World University Games was held on 2 and 4 August 2023 at the Shuangliu Sports Centre Stadium in Chengdu, China.

== Medalists ==
Gold	Silver	Bronze
Wang Qi; China	Décio Andrade; Portugal	Dawid Piłat; Poland

== Results ==
=== Qualification ===
Qualification: Qualifying performance 71.00 (Q) or at least 12 best performers (q) advance to the final.

Rank	Group	Name	Nationality	#1	#2	#3	Result	Notes
1	B	Mykhailo Havryliuk	Ukraine	x	70.90	–	70.90	q
2	A	Hlib Piskunov	Ukraine	68.15	70.69	70.86	70.86	q, SB
3	A	Valentin Andreev	Bulgaria	70.86	70.45	–	70.86	q
4	A	Wang Qi	China	70.38	68.43	70.44	70.44	q
5	A	Décio Andrade	Portugal	70.14	68.19	67.92	70.14	q
6	B	Dawid Piłat	Poland	69.58	70.08	67.87	70.08	q
7	A	Gábor Czeller	Hungary	x	69.29	69.66	69.66	q
8	A	Orestis Ntousakis	Greece	x	69.41	x	69.41	q
9	B	Rúben Antunes	Portugal	68.34	65.80	65.58	68.34	q
10	B	Liu Yuxuan	China	67.09	67.92	66.59	67.92	q
11	B	Benedek Doma	Hungary	65.81	67.52	x	67.52	q
12	A	Ajay Kumar	India	62.30	65.08	x	65.08	q
13	A	Luis Aguiar Da Silva	Brazil	58.95	x	65.01	65.01	
14	A	Håkon Litland	Norway	x	63.54	62.94	63.54	
15	B	Zhivko Gospodinov	Bulgaria	59.71	63.51	x	63.51	
16	B	Gurdev Singh	India	58.96	59.32	x	59.32	
17	B	Ivar Moisander	Sweden	x	59.13	57.69	59.13	
18	B	Mohammed Al-Zayer	Saudi Arabia	59.08	58.90	58.69	59.08	
19	A	Sadat Merzuqi Ajisan	Malaysia	58.72	59.00	x	59.00	
20	B	Mubeen Al-Kindi	Oman	51.94	56.13	x	56.13	
21	B	Mohamed Adel Khan	Kuwait	55.58	54.26	55.30	55.58	
–	A	Tomas Vasiliauskas	Lithuania	x	x	x	NM	

=== Final ===
Rank	Name	Nationality	#1	#2	#3	#4	#5	#6	Result	Notes
1st place, gold medalist(s)	Wang Qi	China	72.27	73.33	73.43	73.63	72.37	72.60	73.63	
2nd place, silver medalist(s)	Décio Andrade	Portugal	71.69	69.13	x	x	71.78	73.43	73.43	
3rd place, bronze medalist(s)	Dawid Piłat	Poland	x	69.49	71.09	72.27	71.90	72.11	72.27	
4	Hlib Piskunov	Ukraine	71.73	69.51	72.19	71.95	71.67	69.87	72.19	SB
5	Mykhailo Havryliuk	Ukraine	71.59	70.57	71.11	x	68.05	67.83	71.59	
6	Orestis Ntousakis	Greece	67.45	x	69.07	68.16	70.26	70.67	70.67	
7	Gábor Czeller	Hungary	69.53	69.61	67.83	x	70.33	69.87	70.33	
8	Rúben Antunes	Portugal	69.81	67.91	70.04	x	68.52	x	70.04	
9	Liu Yuxuan	China	67.76	65.35	66.07				67.76	
10	Benedek Doma	Hungary	67.02	x	x				67.02	
11	Ajay Kumar	India	65.99	x	63.04				65.99	PB
–	Valentin Andreev	Bulgaria	x	x	x				NM	
