= Greece at the 2021 Summer World University Games =

- Flag of Greece
- IOC code: GRE

in Chengdu, China 28 July 2023 – 8 August 2023
- Competitors: 26 (21 men and 5 women)
- Medals: Gold 0 Silver 0 Bronze 0 Total 0

Summer World University Games appearances
- 1959; 1961; 1963; 1965; 1967; 1970; 1973; 1975; 1977; 1979; 1981; 1983; 1985; 1987; 1989; 1991; 1993; 1995; 1997; 1999; 2001; 2003; 2005; 2007; 2009; 2011; 2013; 2015; 2017; 2019; 2021; 2025; 2027

Greece competed at the 2021 Summer World University Games in Chengdu, China held from 28 July to 8 August 2023.

== Competitors ==
Sport	Men	Women	Total
Archery	1	1	2
Artistic gymnastics	2	0	2
Athletics	2	2	4
Rhythmic gymnastics	0	1	1
Swimming	3	1	4
Water polo	13	0	13
Total	21	5	26

== Archery ==
Player	Event	Ranking round		First round	Second round	Third round	Quarter-finals	Semi-finals	Final / BM	
Player	Event	Score	Rank	Opponent score	Opponent score	Opponent score	Opponent score	Opponent score	Opponent score	Rank
Dimitrios Drakiotis	Men's individual compound	694	2	Bye	Veber (KAZ); W 145–141	Chen (CHN); W145–145 (10–9)	Bouleau (FRA); L145–147	Did not advance		6
Lida Nanou	Women's individual recurve	623	22	Zamanova (AZE); W 6–2	Ramel (FRA); L 1–7	Did not advance				17

== Artistic gymnastics ==
Men

Athlete	Event	Qualification								Final							
Athlete	Event	Apparatus						Total	Rank	Apparatus						Total	Rank
Athlete	Event	F	PH	R	V	PB	HB	Total	Rank	F	PH	R	V	PB	HB	Total	Rank
Alkinoos Graikos	All-around	12.100	12.566	12.133	13.633	12.533	11.633	74.598	42	Did not advance							
Stavros Gkinis	All-around	—N/a		12.666	—N/a					Did not advance							

== Athletics ==
Men
Track

Athlete	Event	Heat		Semi-finals		Final	
Athlete	Event	Result	Rank	Result	Rank	Result	Rank
Christos-Panagiotis Roumtsios	110 metres hurdles	13.93 PB	12	—N/a		Did not advance	

Field

Athlete	Event	Qualification		Final	
Athlete	Event	Result	Rank	Result	Rank
Orestis Ntousakis	Hammer throw	69.41	8 q	70.67	6

Women
Track

Athlete	Event	Heat		Semi-finals		Final	
Athlete	Event	Result	Rank	Result	Rank	Result	Rank
Maria Kassou	5000 metres	Did not start					
Maria Kassou	10,000 metres	—N/a				34:50.65	7

Field

Athlete	Event	Qualification		Final	
Athlete	Event	Result	Rank	Result	Rank
Despoina Areti Filippidou	Discus throw	—N/a		49.59	12

== Rhythmic gymnastics ==
Athlete	Event	Apparatus				Total	Rank
Athlete	Event	Hoop (rhythmic gymnastics)	Ball (rhythmic gymnastics)	Clubs (rhythmic gymnastics)	Ribbon (rhythmic gymnastics)	Total	Rank
Maria Dervisi	Individual All-around	28.300	24.700	25.600	24.300	102.900	17

== Swimming ==
Men

Athlete	Event	Heat		Semi-finals		Final	
Athlete	Event	Time	Rank	Time	Rank	Time	Rank
Asterios Daldogiannis	400 metre freestyle	3:58.97	21	—N/a		Did not advance	
Asterios Daldogiannis	800 metre freestyle	8:25.55	16	—N/a		Did not advance	
Asterios Daldogiannis	1500 metre freestyle	15:43.44	9	24.28	134	Did not advance	
Dimitrios Negris	200 metre freestyle	1:54.42	33	Did not advance			
Dimitrios Negris	400 metre freestyle	4:03.15	31	—N/a		Did not advance	
Dimitrios Negris	800 metre freestyle	Did not start					
Christos Papadopoulos	50 metre freestyle	22.82	9 Q	22.70	11	Did not advance	
Christos Papadopoulos	100 metre freestyle	50.36	18	Did not advance			
Christos Papadopoulos	50 metre butterfly	24.37	15 Q	24.28	14	Did not advance	

Women

Athlete	Event	Heat		Semi-finals		Final	
Athlete	Event	Time	Rank	Time	Rank	Time	Rank
Ioanna Sacha	50 metre backstroke	30.32	24	Did not advance			
Ioanna Sacha	100 metre backstroke	1:04.58	19	Did not advance			
Ioanna Sacha	200 metre backstroke	2:16.81	15 Q	2:16.56	14	Did not advance	
Ioanna Sacha	200 metre individual medley	Did not start					

== Water polo ==
Summary

Team	Event	Group stage					Quarter-finals	Semi-finals	Final / BM	
Team	Event	Opponent score	Opponent score	Opponent score	Opponent score	Rank	Opponent score	Opponent score	Opponent score	Rank
(Greece) Men's team	Men's tournament	Singapore (SGP); W 26–5	Germany (GER); L 7–12	Japan (JPN); W 22–11	Hungary (HUN); D 13–13	3 Q	United States (USA); L 8–10	China (CHN); W 19–5	Germany (GER); W 12–10	5
