= Latvia at the 2021 Summer World University Games =

- Flag of Latvia
- IOC code: LAT

in Chengdu, China 28 July 2023 – 8 August 2023
- Competitors: 3 (1 man and 2 women)
- Medals: Gold 0 Silver 0 Bronze 0 Total 0

Summer World University Games appearances
- 1959; 1961; 1963; 1965; 1967; 1970; 1973; 1975; 1977; 1979; 1981; 1983; 1985; 1987; 1989; 1991; 1993; 1995; 1997; 1999; 2001; 2003; 2005; 2007; 2009; 2011; 2013; 2015; 2017; 2019; 2021; 2025; 2027

Latvia competed at the 2021 Summer World University Games in Chengdu, China held from 28 July to 8 August 2023.

== Competitors ==
Sport	Men	Women	Total
Artistic gymnastics	1	1	2
Rhythmic gymnastics	0	1	1

== Artistic gymnastics ==
Men

Athlete	Event	Qualification								Final							
Athlete	Event	Apparatus						Total	Rank	Apparatus						Total	Rank
Athlete	Event	F	PH	R	V	PB	HB	Total	Rank	F	PH	R	V	PB	HB	Total	Rank
Ricards Plate	All-around	12.066	13.100	11.600	13.666	13.033	12.466	75.931	33	Did not advance							

Women

Athlete	Event	Qualification						Final					
Athlete	Event	Apparatus				Total	Rank	Apparatus				Total	Rank
Athlete	Event	V	UB	F	BB	Total	Rank	V	UB	F	BB	Total	Rank
Arina Oļenova	All-around	12.200	9.066	9.266	11.033	41.565	35	Did not advance					

== Rhythmic gymnastics ==
Athlete	Event	Apparatus				Total	Rank
Athlete	Event	Hoop (rhythmic gymnastics)	Ball (rhythmic gymnastics)	Clubs (rhythmic gymnastics)	Ribbon (rhythmic gymnastics)	Total	Rank
Anna Murikova	Individual All-around	25.650	26.400	22.300	25.350	99.700	22
