= Athletics at the 2021 Summer World University Games – Men's high jump =

The men's high jump event at the 2021 Summer World University Games was held on 1 and 3 August 2023 at the Shuangliu Sports Centre Stadium in Chengdu, China.

== Medalists ==
Gold	Silver	Bronze
Vladyslav Lavskyy; Ukraine	Fu Chao-hsuan; Chinese Taipei	Gergely Török; Hungary Tsai Wei-chih; Chinese Taipei Roman Petruk; Ukraine

== Results ==
=== Qualification ===
Qualification: Qualifying performance 2.25 (Q) or at least 12 best performers (q) advance to the final.

Rank	Group	Name	Nationality	1.85	1.90	1.95	2.00	2.05	2.10	2.15	2.20	Result	Notes
1	A	Roman Petruk	Ukraine	–	–	–	–	o	o	o	o	2.20	q
2	A	Alperen Acet	Turkey	–	–	–	–	o	o	o	xo	2.20	q
2	A	Tejaswin Shankar	India	–	–	–	–	o	o	o	xo	2.20	q, PB
4	B	Wang Zhen	China	–	–	–	–	o	–	xo	xo	2.20	q
5	B	Fu Chao-hsuan	Chinese Taipei	–	–	–	–	–	o	o	xxo	2.20	q
5	A	Tawan Kaeodam	Thailand	–	–	–	–	o	o	o	xxo	2.20	q
7	A	Chen Long	China	–	–	–	o	o	o	xo	xxo	2.20	q, SB
7	B	Vladyslav Lavskyy	Ukraine	–	–	–	–	o	o	xo	xxo	2.20	q
9	B	Sébastien Micheau	France	–	–	–	–	o	o	o	xxx	2.15	q
9	A	Breyton Poole	South Africa	–	–	–	–	o	o	o	xxx	2.15	q
9	B	Brian Raats	South Africa	–	–	–	–	o	o	o	xxx	2.15	q
9	B	Gergely Török	Hungary	–	–	–	–	o	o	o	xxx	2.15	q
9	A	Tsai Wei-chih	Chinese Taipei	–	–	–	–	o	o	o	xxx	2.15	q
14	A	Juozas Baikštys	Lithuania	–	–	–	xo	o	o	xo	xxx	2.15	
15	A	Hamdi Ali	Qatar	–	–	–	–	o	o	xxx		2.10	
15	B	Fatak Bait Jaboob	Oman	–	–	–	–	o	o	xxx		2.10	
15	B	Mohamad Dahalan	Malaysia	–	–	–	–	o	o	xxx		2.10	
15	A	Mátyás Guth	Hungary	–	–	–	o	o	o	xxx		2.10	
19	B	Tharinda Dasun	Sri Lanka	–	–	–	xo	o	o	xxx		2.10	
20	B	Bilel Afer	Algeria	–	–	–	o	o	xo	xxx		2.10	
21	A	Michael Millslagle	United States	–	–	xo	o	o	xxx			2.05	
22	B	Swadhin Kumar Majhi	India	–	o	o	o	xo	xxx			2.05	
23	A	Kampton Kam	Singapore	–	–	–	o	xxx				2.00	
24	B	Hashem Al-Ali	Kuwait	–	o	–	xxo	xxx				2.00	
25	B	Yan Chan	Cambodia	–	xo	o	xxx					1.95	
26	A	Ng Chi Kit	Macau	–	o	xxo	xxx					1.95	PB
–	A	Hervé Cubahiro	Burundi									DNS	

=== Final ===
Rank	Name	Nationality	2.05	2.10	2.15	2.20	2.25	2.28	Result	Notes
1st place, gold medalist(s)	Vladyslav Lavskyy	Ukraine	o	o	o	o	xo	xxx	2.25	PB
2nd place, silver medalist(s)	Fu Chao-hsuan	Chinese Taipei	–	o	o	xo	xxx		2.20	
3rd place, bronze medalist(s)	Roman Petruk	Ukraine	–	o	o	xxo	xxx		2.20	
3rd place, bronze medalist(s)	Gergely Török	Hungary	–	o	o	xxo	xxx		2.20	PB
3rd place, bronze medalist(s)	Tsai Wei-chih	Chinese Taipei	o	o	o	xxo	xxx		2.20	PB
6	Breyton Poole	South Africa	–	o	o	xxx			2.15	
6	Tejaswin Shankar	India	o	o	o	xxx			2.15	
6	Wang Zhen	China	o	–	o	xxx			2.15	
9	Alperen Acet	Turkey	xo	o	o	xxx			2.15	
10	Chen Long	China	o	o	xo	xxx			2.15	
11	Tawan Kaeodam	Thailand	xo	o	xo	xxx			2.15	
12	Brian Raats	South Africa	o	xo	xxx				2.10	
13	Sébastien Micheau	France	o	xxx					2.05	
