= Décio Andrade =

Portuguese athlete (born 1997)

Personal information
- Full name: Décio Gonçalves Andrade
- Nationality: Portuguese
- Born: 25 January 1997 (age 29) Camacha, Madeira, Portugal

Sport
- Country: Portugal
- Sport: Athletics
- Event: Hammer throw
- Club: SL Benfica
- Coached by: Sérgio Cruz

Achievements and titles
- Personal best: Hammer throw: 73.77m
Medal record
Men's athletics
Representing Portugal
2021 Summer World University Games
| Silver medal – second place | 2021 Chengdu | Hammer throw |

Décio Andrade (Camacha, Madeira, 25 January 1997) is a Portuguese athlete specialized in the hammer throw event.

Having been amongst the best throwers in the country since his youth, he has competed for Portugal in several international competitions, winning a silver medal at 2021 Summer World University Games.

Andrade competed for the Miami Hurricanes track and field team in the NCAA.

He is fifth in Portugal's hammer throw's all time lists.

== International competitions ==
Representing Portugal
| Year | Competition | Venue | Position | Event | Time |
|---|---|---|---|---|---|
| 2013 | European Youth Summer Olympic Festival | Utrecht, Netherlands | 17th (q) | Discus throw (1,5kg) | 43.01 m |
| 2013 | European Youth Summer Olympic Festival | Utrecht, Netherlands | 9th | Hammer throw (5kg) | 60.96 m |
| 2014 | European Youth Olympic Trials | Baku, Azerbaijan | not classified | Hammer throw (5kg) | NM |
| 2018 | Mediterranean Athletics U23 Championships | Tarragona, Spain | 5th | Hammer Throw | 62.62 m |
| 2019 | European Throwing Cup | Šamorín, Slovakia | 6th | U23 Hammer throw | 66.77 m |
| 2019 | European Athletics U23 Championships | Gävle, Sweden | 11th | Hammer throw | 66.96 m |
| 2023 | Summer World University Games | Chengdu, China | 2th | Hammer Throw | 73.43 m |
| 2024 | Ibero-American Championships in Athletics | Cuiaba, Brazil | 6ht | Hammer throw | 70.16 m |
| 2025 | European Throwing Cup | Nicosia, Cyprus | 9th | Hammer throw | 69.38 m |
| 2026 | Ibero-American Championships | Lima, Peru | 6th | Hammer throw | 69.27 m |
