= Kuwait at the 2021 Summer World University Games =

- Flag of Kuwait
- IOC code: KUW

in Chengdu, China 28 July 2023 – 8 August 2023
- Competitors: 5 (5 men)
- Medals: Gold 0 Silver 0 Bronze 0 Total 0

Summer World University Games appearances
- 1959; 1961; 1963; 1965; 1967; 1970; 1973; 1975; 1977; 1979; 1981; 1983; 1985; 1987; 1989; 1991; 1993; 1995; 1997; 1999; 2001; 2003; 2005; 2007; 2009; 2011; 2013; 2015; 2017; 2019; 2021; 2025; 2027

Kuwait competed at the 2021 Summer World University Games in Chengdu, China held from 28 July to 8 August 2023.

== Competitors ==
Sport	Men	Women	Total
Athletics	3	0	3
Swimming	2	0	2

== Athletics ==
Men

Athlete	Event	Qualification		Final	
Athlete	Event	Result	Rank	Result	Rank
Hashem Al-Ali	High jump	2.00	24	Did not advance	
Abdullah Al-Zankawi	Discus throw	—		NM	
Mohammad Khan	Hammer throw	55.58	21	Did not advance	

== Swimming ==
Men

Athlete	Event	Heat		Semi-finals		Final	
Athlete	Event	Time	Rank	Time	Rank	Time	Rank
Ali Buabbas	50 metre breaststroke	32.05	43	Did not advance			
Ali Buabbas	100 metre breaststroke	1:11.62	42	Did not advance			
Waleed Abdulrazzaq	50 metre freestyle	23.83	34	Did not advance			
Waleed Abdulrazzaq	100 metre freestyle	50.85	26	Did not advance			
Waleed Abdulrazzaq	50 metre butterfly	24.45	18	Did not advance			
Waleed Abdulrazzaq	100 metre butterfly	55.34	26	Did not advance			
