= Shi Cong =

Chinese artistic gymnast

- 侍聪
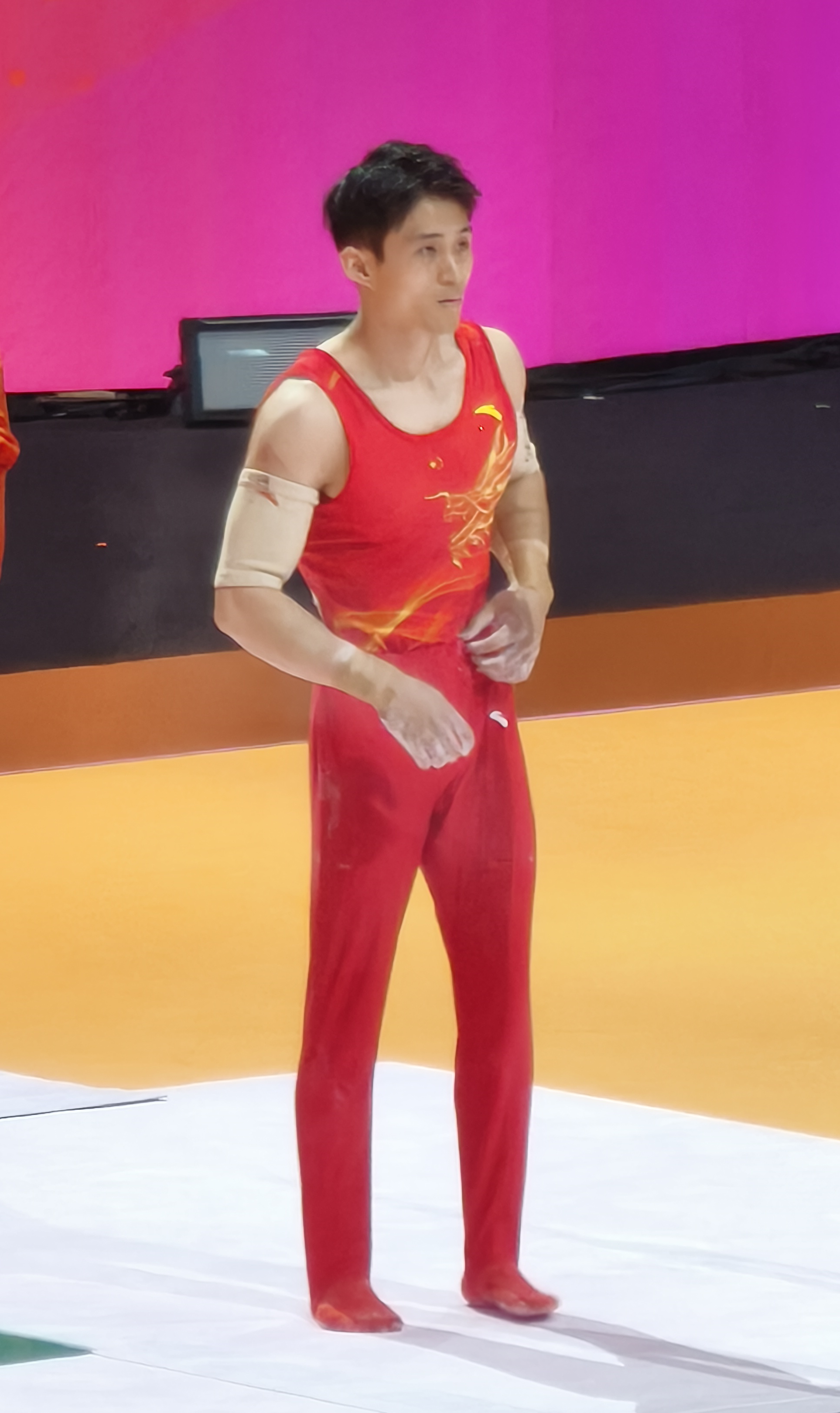
- Shi at 2025 World Championships

Personal information
- Born: 12 March 2001 (age 25) Xuzhou, China

Gymnastics career
- Discipline: Men's artistic gymnastics
- Country represented: China
- Club: Jiangsu Province
Medal record
Representing China
World Championships
Silver medal – second place	2023 Antwerp	Team
Silver medal – second place	2023 Antwerp	Parallel Bars
Bronze medal – third place	2021 Kitakyushu	Parallel Bars
Asian Championships
Gold medal – first place	2022 Doha	Team
Gold medal – first place	2022 Doha	All-Around
Silver medal – second place	2025 Jecheon	Team
World University Games
Gold medal – first place	2021 Chengdu	Team
Silver medal – second place	2021 Chengdu	All-Around
Silver medal – second place	2021 Chengdu	Horizontal Bar
National Games
Gold medal – first place	2021 Shaanxi	Team
Gold medal – first place	2025 Guangdong	Team
Bronze medal – third place	2025 Guangdong	Parallel Bars

Shi Cong (Chinese: 侍聪; pinyin: Shì Cōng; born 12 March 2001) is a Chinese artistic gymnast. He competed in the Junior Asian Gymnastics Championships in 2017 and 2018 in Bangkok and Jakarta respectively. In 2017 we won a silver medal with the Chinese junior team. In 2018, he won the gold for the all-around competition as well as two bronzes on high bar and floor exercise. As a senior, he was part of the team sent to compete at the 2021 World Artistic Gymnastics Championships in Kitakyushu. He qualified in 4th in the all-around and placed 6th in the all-around final. He also placed 4th in the parallel bar qualifiers, but was surpassed by his teammates Hu Xuwei and Zhang Boheng and was therefore not able to qualify. After Zhang Boheng won the all-around final, he withdrew from event final competition and Shi Cong was given a spot in the parallel bar final. In the final he went on to win the bronze medal.

He competed at the 2023 World Artistic Gymnastics Championships in Antwerp with the Chinese team which captured silver in the team final. He qualified in 5th for the Parallel Bar individual event and eventually won a silver medal in the final.
