= 2019 European Athletics U23 Championships – Men's hammer throw =

The men's hammer throw event at the 2019 European Athletics U23 Championships will be held in Gävle, Sweden, at Gavlehov Stadium Park on 12 and 13 July.

== Medalists ==
Gold	Silver	Bronze
Alberto González; Spain	Bence Halász; Hungary	Myhaylo Havrylyuk; Ukraine

== Results ==
=== Qualification ===
Qualification rule: 70.50 (Q) or the 12 best results (q) qualified for the final.

Rank	Group	Name	Nationality	#1	#2	#3	Results	Notes
1	B	Bence Halász	Hungary	73.49			73.49	Q
2	A	Alberto González	Spain	69.37	73.29		73.29	Q
3	A	Aaron Kangas	Finland	68.54	69.08	70.87	70.87	Q
4	B	Dániel Rába	Hungary	70.81			70.81	Q
5	A	Yann Chaussinand	France	69.73	68.80	x	69.73	q
6	B	Myhaylo Havrylyuk	Ukraine	68.08	68.31	69.72	69.72	q
7	A	Jake Norris	Great Britain	69.09	69.47	x	69.47	q
8	A	Aliaksandr Shymanovich	Belarus	68.07	68.30	68.89	68.89	q
9	B	Décio Andrade	Portugal	67.58	x	68.06	68.06	q
10	B	Balázs Varga	Hungary	67.71	x	67.34	67.71	q
11	A	Roope Auvinen	Finland	65.48	x	67.26	67.26	q
12	B	Aleksi Jaakkola	Finland	x	67.03	66.04	67.03	q
13	B	Enguerrand Decroix Tetu	France	65.03	66.82	63.95	66.82	
14	A	Giacomo Proserpio	Italy	66.69	x	x	66.69	
15	A	Ruben Antunes	Portugal	61.47	65.03	60.83	65.03	
16	B	Owen Russell	Ireland	x	61.60	63.69	63.69	
17	A	Mihăiță Andrei Micu	Romania	62.34	63.55	x	63.55	
18	B	Tomas Vasiliauskas	Lithuania	61.22	62.59	61.07	62.59	
19	A	Dan Morari	Moldova	61.97	x	x	61.97	
20	B	Nikola Mikhov	Bulgaria	60.19	61.51	60.43	61.51	
21	A	Hakan Mert Sözüdiri	Turkey	x	60.64	61.32	61.32	
22	A	Lasha-Giorgi Gurgenidze	Georgia	59.61	x	x	59.61	
23	B	Elčins Gasanovs	Latvia	59.14	x	x	59.14	
	B	Mikhail Bryl	Belarus	x	x	x	NM	

=== Final ===
Rank	Name	Nationality	#1	#2	#3	#4	#5	#6	Result	Notes
1st place, gold medalist(s)	Alberto González	Spain	71.91	73.36	x	74.36	x	x	74.36	PB
2nd place, silver medalist(s)	Bence Halász	Hungary	74.14	68.97	73.02	70.57	x	x	74.14	
3rd place, bronze medalist(s)	Myhaylo Havrylyuk	Ukraine	x	69.80	71.21	x	72.21	x	72.21	
4	Dániel Rába	Hungary	67.34	70.03	x	x	70.80	70.62	70.80	
5	Aaron Kangas	Finland	68.72	65.77	67.38	70.28	70.30	70.58	70.58	
6	Aliaksandr Shymanovich	Belarus	69.95	70.56	70.16	70.54	68.25	69.46	70.56	
7	Aleksi Jaakkola	Finland	68.03	70.08	x	69.48	x	69.11	70.08	
8	Yann Chaussinand	France	68.97	x	67.60	64.50	x	x	68.97	
9	Jake Norris	Great Britain	67.96	68.08	68.64				68.64	
10	Roope Auvinen	Finland	67.43	x	67.96				67.96	
11	Décio Andrade	Portugal	66.96	65.42	64.65				66.96	
12	Balázs Varga	Hungary	62.94	66.41	64.71				66.41	
