= Chase Holfelder =

American singer-songwriter

- Born: Long Island, New York
- Occupations: Singer, songwriter, music producer, YouTuber
- Known for: "Major to Minor" Series on YouTube
- Website: chaseholfelder.com

Chase Holfelder is an American singer, songwriter and music producer residing in Raleigh, North Carolina. He is best known for his "Major to Minor" series of YouTube videos in which he performs minor-key renditions of popular major-key songs. As of October 2026, his channel has amassed over 100 million views and has over 750,000 subscribers.

== Career ==
Holfelder first began his YouTube channel along with his popular "Major to Minor" series in April 2014 when he uploaded an a cappella minor-key rendition of "The Star-Spangled Banner." Holfelder has since created 40 videos for the series.

On August 5, 2014, Holfelder's minor-key version of "Amazing Grace" was featured during the intro to the season 10 finale of the popular The Discovery Channel show, Deadliest Catch.

On October 19, 2014, Taylor Swift praised Holfelder's cover of her song, "Out of the Woods," in a tweet.

On May 2, 2015, Richard Marx tweeted his approval of Holfelder's cover of his hit song, "Right Here Waiting".

During the 2015 NFL season, several of Holfelder's minor key covers were featured on ESPN's Sunday NFL Countdown.

In December 2015, popular YouTuber Kurt Hugo Schneider directed a music video for Holfelder's minor-key version of Mariah Carey's "All I Want For Christmas Is You". Within a week of being uploaded, the video received over 3.5 million views and social media shares from various celebrities, including Ashton Kutcher, George Takei, and Lil Wayne.

On October 30, 2017, Holfelder's minor-key arrangement of "Every Breath You Take" by The Police was performed by the Dancing With The Stars band during Frankie Muniz and Witney Carson's contemporary routine.

On November 1, 2017, Sara Bareilles shared Holfelder's cover of her song "She Used To Be Mine" from the musical Waitress.

== Albums ==
=== Major to Minor (Vol 1.) ===
On September 8, 2015, Chase compiled all of his major-to-minor renditions up to that point in an album called Major to Minor (Vol. 1).

| No. | Title | Length |
|---|---|---|
| 1. | "Best Day Of My Life" | 3:26 |
| 2. | "Girls Just Want To Have Fun" | 3:23 |
| 3. | "Animal" | 3:43 |
| 4. | "Blackbird" | 2:51 |
| 5. | "Every Breath You Take" | 2:46 |
| 6. | "Fortunate Son" | 3:29 |
| 7. | "I Dreamed A Dream" | 3:43 |
| 8. | "Runaround Sue" | 3:36 |
| 9. | "Right Here Waiting" | 3:57 |
| 10. | "I Want You To Want Me" | 4:33 |
| 11. | "Amazing Grace" | 1:32 |
| 12. | "The Star-Spangled Banner" | 1:44 |
| 13. | "My Country, 'Tis Of Thee" | 2:41 |

During the week of January 2, 2016, Major to Minor (Vol. 1) reached #13 on the Billboard Top Heatseekers chart.

== Past projects ==
From 2005 to 2008, Holfelder toured in the pop-rock band The Mile After (of which he was a founding member). Holfelder was the lead singer, guitarist and primary songwriter. The Mile After was briefly signed to Rushmore Records, a subsidiary of the now defunct Drive-Thru Records, although the band never released an album on the label. In a statement on AbsolutePunk.net, the band cites its departure from the label was "due to disagreements in the direction of the band." The band broke up in 2008.
