= Latvia at the 2015 Summer Universiade =

- IOC code: LAT
- NOC: Latvian Olympic Committee
- Website: http://www.olimpiade.lv/

in Gwangju, South Korea 3 – 14 July 2015
- Competitors: 47 in 10 sports
- Medals Ranked 47th: Gold 0 Silver 2 Bronze 1 Total 3

Summer Universiade appearances
- 1959; 1961; 1963; 1965; 1967; 1970; 1973; 1975; 1977; 1979; 1981; 1983; 1985; 1987; 1989; 1991; 1993; 1995; 1997; 1999; 2001; 2003; 2005; 2007; 2009; 2011; 2013; 2015; 2017; 2019; 2021

Latvia competed at the 2015 Summer Universiade in Gwangju, South Korea.

== Medal by sports ==
Medals by sport
Sport	1st place, gold medalist(s)	2nd place, silver medalist(s)	3rd place, bronze medalist(s)	Total
Athletics	0	2	1	3
Total	0	2	1	3

== Medalists ==
Medal	Name	Sport	Event	Date
Silver	Madara Onuzane	Athletics	Women's High Jump	12 July
Silver	Līna Mūze	Athletics	Women's Javelin Throw	12 July
Bronze	Zigismunds Sirmais	Athletics	Men's Javelin Throw	10 July
