= Dariia Ivanyk =

Ukrainian rhythmic gymnast

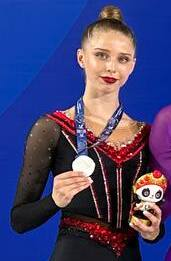
- Ivanyk at the 2021 Summer World University Games

Personal information
- Full name: Dariia Ihorivna Ivanyk
- Born: March 6, 2005 (age 21) Lutsk, Ukraine

Gymnastics career
- Discipline: Rhythmic gymnastics
- Country represented: Ukraine
- Retired: yes
Medal record
Rhythmic Gymnastics
Representing Ukraine
Event	1st	2nd	3rd
Summer Universiade	0	1	1
Total	0	1	1
Summer Universiade
Silver medal – second place	2021 Chengdu	Group all-around
Bronze medal – third place	2021 Chengdu	5 Hoops

Dariia Ihorivna Ivanyk (Ukrainian: Дарія Ігорівна Іваник, born 6 March 2005) is a Ukrainian retired rhythmic gymnast, member of the national group.

== Biography ==
Since 2022, Dariia is a student of law department of Ivan Franko National University of Lviv.

In November 2023, she was recognized as a "Student of the Year" of Ivan Franko National University of Lviv.

== Career ==
In 2023, she competed, as a member of the national group, at the 2021 Universiade in Chengdu winning silver in the All-Around and bronze with 5 hoops.
