= Alberto González (hammer thrower) =

Spanish hammer thrower

Personal information
- Full name: Alberto González Moyano
- Born: 1 June 1998 (age 28) Jaén, Spain
- Height: 1.95 m (6 ft 5 in)
- Weight: 105 kg (231 lb)

Sport
- Sport: Athletics
- Event: Hammer throw
- Club: Unicaja Jaén Paraíso Interior
- Coached by: Joaquín Moyano

Alberto González Moyano (born 1 June 1998) is a Spanish athlete specialising in the hammer throw. He represented his country at the 2019 World Championships without reaching the final. Earlier that year he won a gold medal at the 2019 European U23 Championships.

His personal best in the event is 75.78 metres set in Andújar in 2019.

== International competitions ==
Year	Competition	Venue	Position	Event	Notes
Representing Spain
2015	World Youth Championships	Cali, Colombia	9th	Hammer throw (5 kg)	71.18 m
2016	World U20 Championships	Bydgoszcz, Poland	5th	Hammer throw (6 kg)	75.52 m
2017	European U20 Championships	Grosseto, Italy	6th	Hammer throw (6 kg)	72.71 m
2018	European Throwing Cup (U23)	Leiria, Portugal	3rd	Hammer throw	70.61 m
2018	Mediterranean U23 Championships	Jesolo, Italy	4th	Hammer throw	64.04 m
2019	European U23 Championships	Gävle, Sweden	1st	Hammer throw	74.36 m
2019	World Championships	Doha, Qatar	28th (q)	Hammer throw	71.69 m
2022	Mediterranean Games	Oran, Algeria	11th	Hammer throw	66.49 m
2023	European Games	Chorzów, Poland	20th	Hammer throw	68.23
