= Vladyslav Lavskyy =

Ukrainian track and field athlete

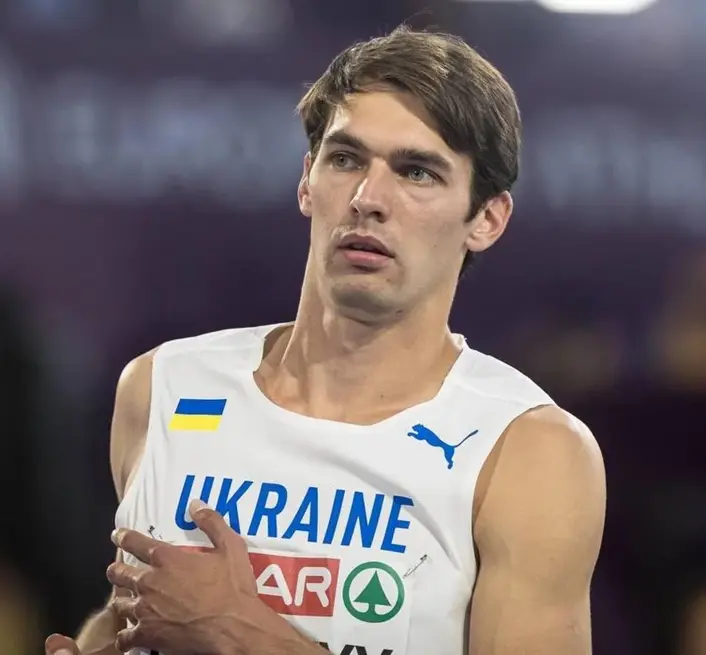

Personal information
- Native name: Владислав Лавський
- Born: 16 March 2000 (age 26) Mena, Chernihiv Oblast, Ukraine

Sport
- Country: Ukraine
- Sport: Athletics
- Event: High jump

Achievements and titles
- Personal best: High jump: 2.29 (2024)
Medal record
European Championships
Silver medal – second place	2024 Rome	High jump
Summer World University Games
Gold medal – first place	2021 Chengdu	High jump
World U18 Championships
Bronze medal – third place	2017 Nairobi	High jump

Vladyslav Fedorovych Lavskyy (Ukrainian: Владислав Федорович Лавський; born 16 March 2000) is a Ukrainian track and field athlete.

Lavskyy was born in Mena and won bronze in the high jump at the 2017 IAAF World U18 Championships. He is studying at the Lviv National Stepan Gzhytsky University of Veterinary Medicine and Biotechnology. He won a gold medal in the high jump at the 2021 Summer World University Games.

== Career ==
Lavskyi won the bronze medal at the 2017 World Youth Championships, where he reached 2.11 meters.

He also competed at the 2018 IAAF World U20 Championships, 2019 European Athletics U20 Championships and 2021 European Athletics U23 Championships, among other competitions, without reaching the final.

Lavskyi's personal best jump is 2.25 meters, achieved in August 2023 in Chengdu at the 2021 Summer World University Games, where he won a gold medal.
