= Khrystyna Pohranychna =

Ukrainian rhythmic gymnast

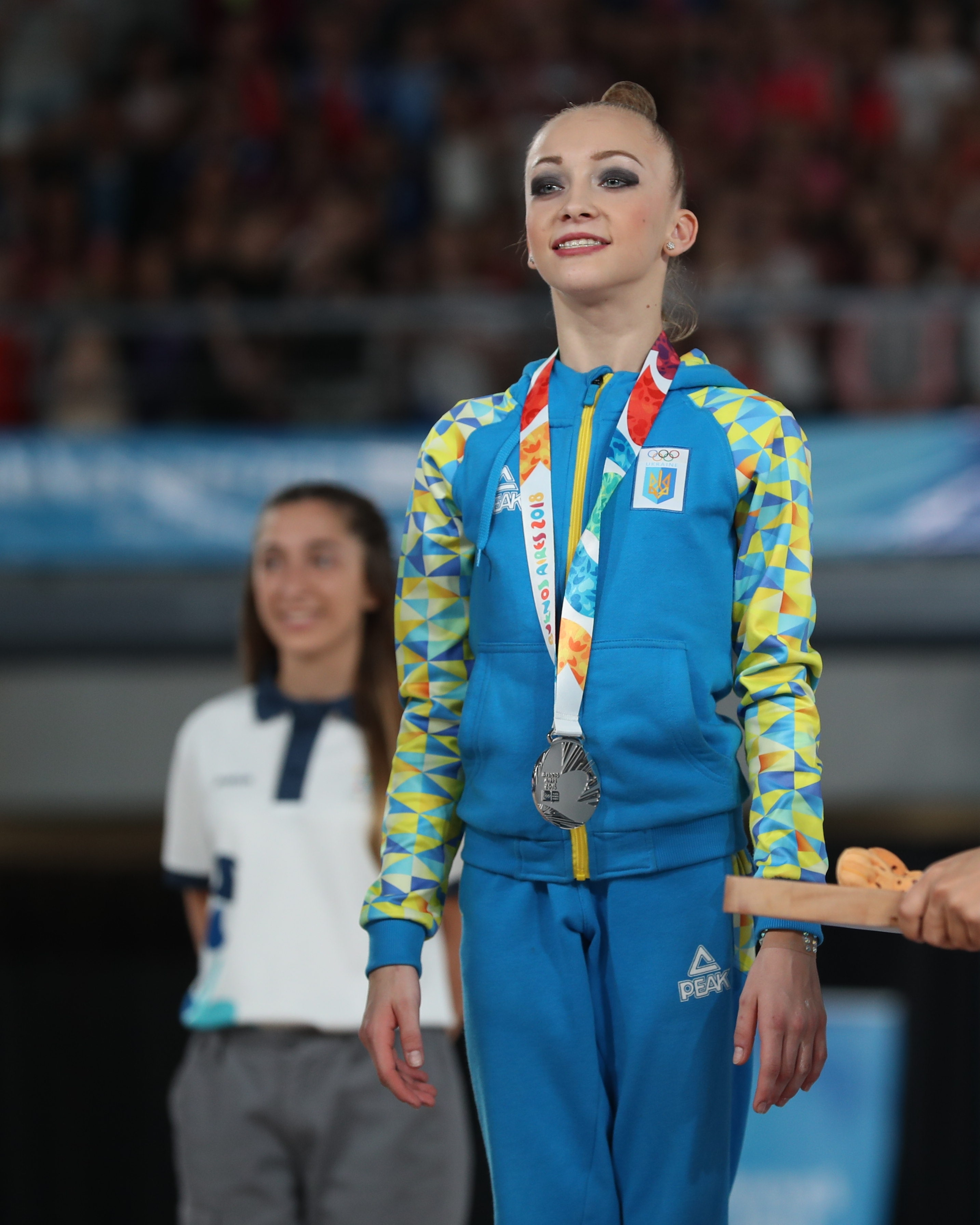
- Pohranychna at the 2018 Youth Olympic Games

Personal information
- Full name: Khrystyna Oleksandrivna Pohranychna
- Nicknames: Kristya, Khrystya
- Born: 13 May 2003 (age 23) Lviv, Ukraine
- Height: 150 cm (4 ft 11 in)

Gymnastics career
- Discipline: Rhythmic gymnastics
- Country represented: Ukraine; (2016-2026)
- Club: Nika Sports Club
- Head coach: Iryna Ruda
- Assistant coach: Lyudmyla Yakovenko
- Choreographer: Hanna Soprunova
- Retired: yes
Medal record
Representing Ukraine
Rhythmic Gymnastics
Event	1st	2nd	3rd
Summer Universiade	2	1	0
Junior European Championships	0	3	1
World Cup	0	1	1
Gymnasiade	2	3	0
Total	4	8	2
Youth Olympic Games
Silver medal – second place	2018 Buenos Aires	All-around
Summer Universiade
Gold medal – first place	2021 Chengdu	Hoop
Gold medal – first place	2021 Chengdu	Ribbon
Silver medal – second place	2021 Chengdu	All-around
Junior European Championships
Silver medal – second place	2018 Guadalajara	Ball
Silver medal – second place	2018 Guadalajara	Ribbon
Silver medal – second place	2018 Guadalajara	Team
Bronze medal – third place	2018 Guadalajara	Hoop
Grand Prix Final
Gold medal – first place	2023 Brno	All-around
Gold medal – first place	2023 Brno	Ball
Gold medal – first place	2023 Brno	Clubs
Gold medal – first place	2023 Brno	Ribbon
Silver medal – second place	2023 Brno	Hoop
Summer Gymnasiade
Gold medal – first place	2018 Marrakech	All-around
Gold medal – first place	2018 Marrakech	Ribbon
Silver medal – second place	2018 Marrakech	Clubs
Silver medal – second place	2018 Marrakech	Ball
Silver medal – second place	2018 Marrakech	Hoop

Khrystyna Oleksandrivna Pohranychna (Ukrainian: Христина Олександрівна Погранична; born 13 May 2003) is a Ukrainian retired individual rhythmic gymnast. She is the 2018 Youth Olympic Games all-around silver medalist, a 2020 Olympic Games all-around finalist, and a four-time medalist at the 2018 European Junior Championships.

On national level, she is a two-time (2017, 2018) Junior All-around champion. In the senior category, she is two-time (2019, 2021) all-around silver medalist and a two-time (2023, 2024) all-around bronze medalist.

== Early life ==
Pohranychna was born in Lviv on 13 May 2003. Her mother is a surgeon and her father is a journalist. She has a sister named Olesya who is two years older than her and a younger sister Angela who was born in 2017. Olesya and Khrystyna began rhythmic gymnastics when Khrystyna was five years old at the Nika Sports Club in Lviv. Her inspiration is Ukrainian rhythmic gymnast and Olympic medalist Hanna Rizatdinova.

== Junior career ==
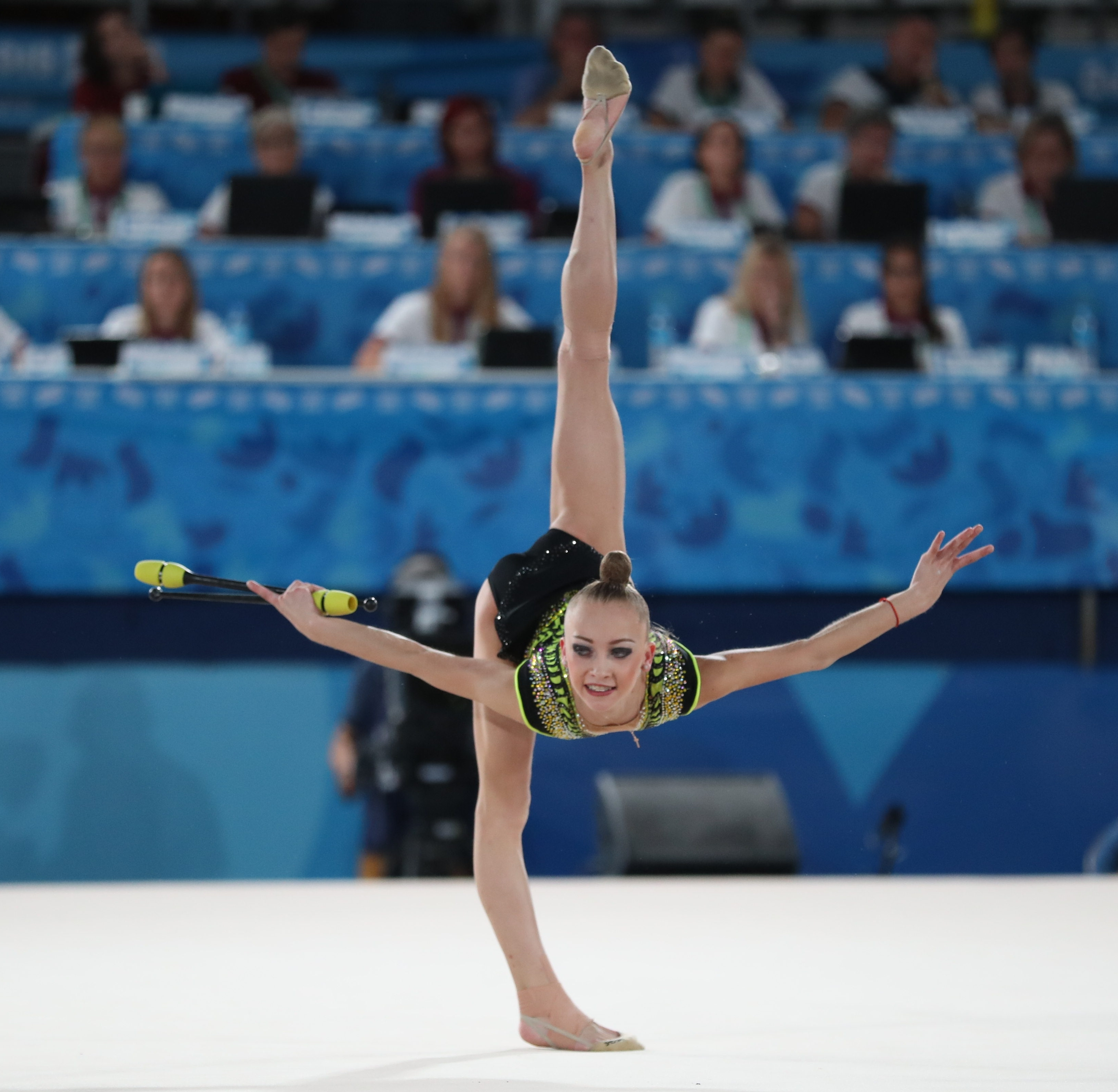
Pohranychna at the 2018 Youth Olympic Games

Pohranychna was added to the junior national team in 2016. She made her international debut at the 2016 Junior European Championships in Holon and placed sixth in the team competition alongside Olena Diachenko and Yeva Meleshchuk. She qualified for the rope final, where she also finished sixth.

Pohranychna became the 2017 Ukrainian junior all-around champion; she was the first gymnast from Lviv to win the Ukrainian Rhythmic Gymnastics Championships since Ukrainian independence.

At the 2018 European Championships in Guadalajara, Spain, Pohranychna, Viktoriia Onopriienko, and Anastasiya Voznyak won the team silver medal behind Russia. She won the silver medals in the ball and ribbon event finals, both behind Russia's Lala Kramarenko, and she won the hoop bronze and placed fourth in clubs. She was then selected to represent Ukraine at the 2018 Summer Youth Olympics, and she won the silver medal in the individual all-around behind Russia's Daria Trubnikova.

== Senior career ==
=== 2019 ===
Pohranychna became age eligible for senior competition in 2019. She made her senior international debut at the Pesaro World Cup and placed fifth in the hoop final. Then at the Tashkent World Cup, she placed fourth in the all-around and also qualified for all four event finals. In the event finals, she finished fourth in ball, sixth in hoop and clubs, and eighth in ribbon. She won her first World Cup medal at the Guadalajara World Challenge Cup with a silver in hoop behind Russia's Alexandra Soldatova. She then won the all-around silver medal behind Vlada Nikolchenko at the Ukrainian Championships. Then at the Cluj Napoca World Challenge Cup, she placed sixth in both hoop and clubs.

At the World Championships in Baku,she finished fifth in the team competition alongside Vlada Nikolchenko and Yeva Meleshchuk. She then finished twelfth in the all-around final with a score of 80.575, earning Ukraine a second quota for the 2020 Olympic Games.

=== 2020 ===
Pohranychna did not compete at the beginning of the season due to the COVID-19 pandemic. In September, she placed fifth in the ball, club, and ribbon and sixth in the all-around and hoop at the Deriugina Cup.

=== 2021 ===
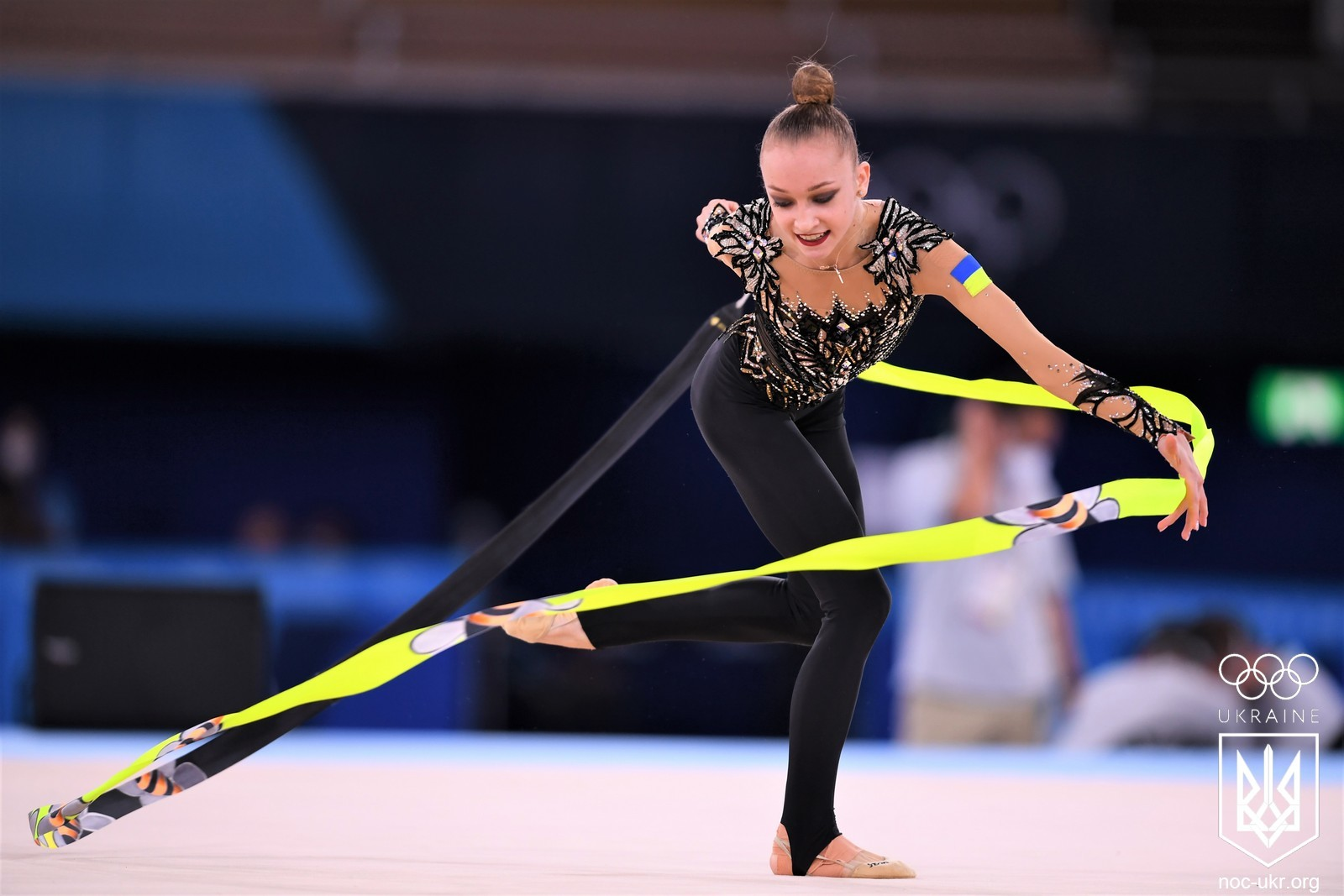
Pohranychna at the 2020 Olympic Games

In March 2021, Pohranychna tested positive for COVID-19 and had to miss the Sofia World Cup. She returned to competition at the Tashkent World Cup and placed seventh in the clubs and ribbon event finals. At the Ukrainian Championships, she won the all-around silver medal by only 0.100 behind Viktoriia Onopriienko. She then finished fifteenth in the all-around at the Pesaro World Cup.

In June, she competed at her first senior European Championships in Varna, Bulgaria. She only competed with the ribbon, helping the Ukrainian team place fifth and qualifying for the ribbon final. In the ribbon final, she placed sixth with a score of 22.000. In July, she competed at the Minsk World Challenge Cup and won her second World Cup medal, a bronze in the ribbon, and also placed sixth in the all-around.

Pohranychna and Viktoriia Onopriienko were selected to represent Ukraine at the 2020 Summer Olympics in Tokyo. Pohranychna qualified for the individual all-around final in tenth place, ahead of Japan's Sumire Kita by 0.300. In the all-around final, she finished in ninth place ahead of Onopriienko with a total score of 95.100.

After the Olympic Games, Pohranychna competed at the World Championships in Kitakyushu, Japan. In the ribbon final, she placed fourth with a score of 21.950 behind Alina Harnasko and Dina and Arina Averina. She also placed eighth in the hoop and clubs finals. She then competed in the all-around final and finished in eleventh place, and Ukraine placed fourth in the team competition.

=== 2022 ===
Pohranychna had surgery on her knee at the beginning of the year. She began volunteering as a medical assistant during the Russian invasion of Ukraine.

=== 2023 ===
She represented Ukraine at the 2021 Summer Universiade in Chengdu, China, which was postponed from 2021 to 2023 because of the COVID-19 pandemic. She won the silver medal in the all-around, behind Hungarian Fanni Pigniczki, and two gold medals in the apparatus finals (hoop and ribbon).

=== 2024 ===
Pohranychna won the bronze medal in the all-around at the Ukrainian National Championship in April. She competed at the 1st European Cup in Baku, where she placed 12th in all-around qualifications.

=== 2025 ===
On July 17-19, she represented Ukraine at the 2025 Summer Universiade in Essen, Germany, and took 14th place in the all-around. She qualified to the clubs final only, taking 8th place.

=== 2026 ===
Pohranychna announced her retirement from competition in August.

== Awards ==
Pohranychna was voted "Lvivian of the Year" by the citizens of Lviv in 2017.

== Routine music ==
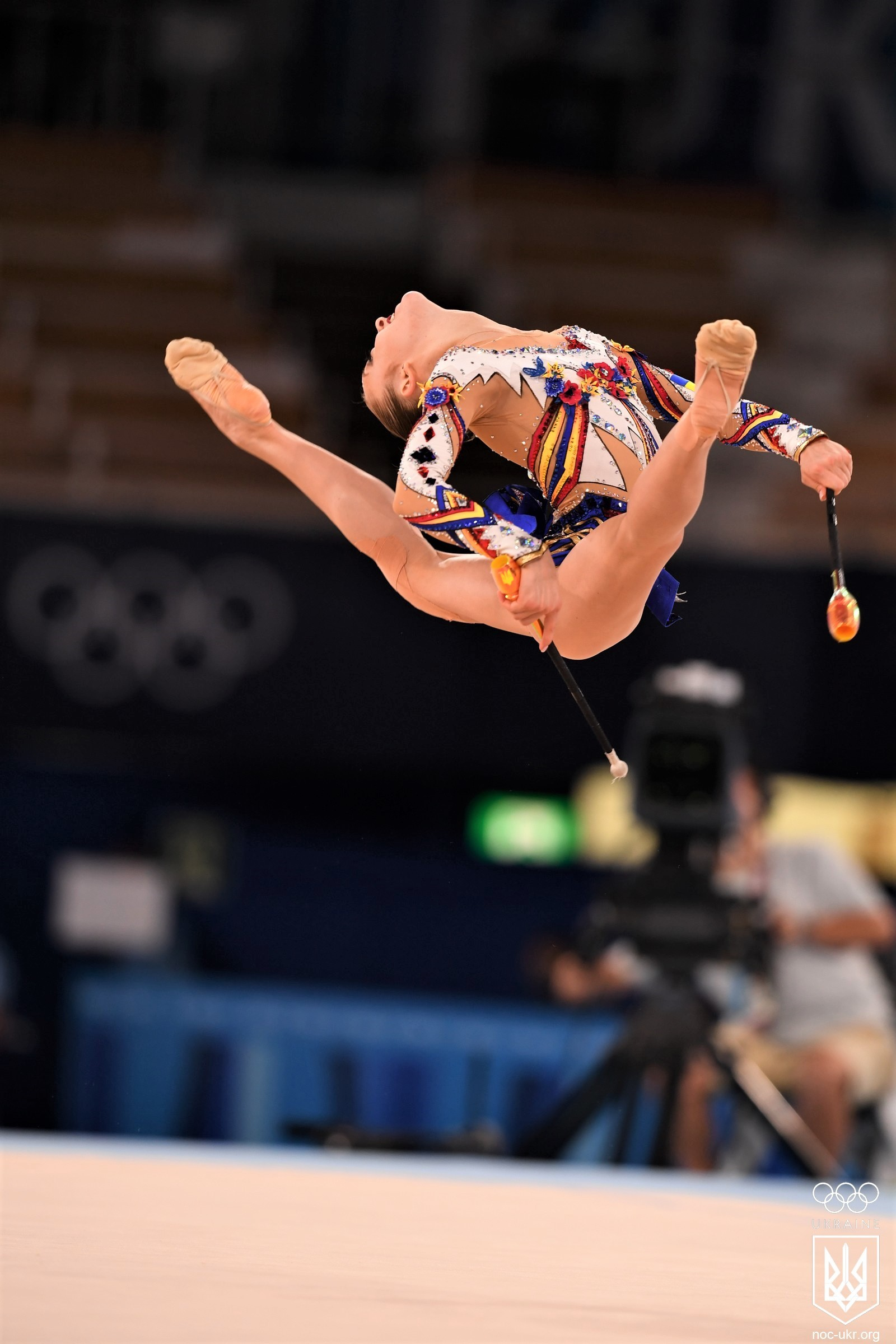
Pohranychna at the 2020 Olympic Games

Year	Apparatus	Music title
2016	Rope	???
2016	Hoop (first)	"Bumble Bee Boogie" by Robert Wells
2016	Hoop (second)	"Voodoo People" by The Prodigy, "Shallow Grave" by Steve Mason Experience
2016	Ball	"Love Runs Out" by OneRepublic
2016	Clubs	"Jazz Machine" by Black Machine, "Only You" by Max Greger
2016	Ribbon	"Tanguera" by Sexteto Mayor
2017	Hoop	"Voodoo People" by The Prodigy, "Shallow Grave" by Steve Mason Experience
2017	Ball	"Humanity" by Scorpions
2017	Clubs	"Escape from East Berlin" by Daniel Pemberton
2017	Ribbon	"Human" by Rag'n'Bone Man
2018	Hoop	"Voodoo People" by The Prodigy, "Shallow Grave" by Steve Mason Experience
2018	Ball	"Believer" by Chase Holfelder
2018	Clubs	"Escape from East Berlin" by Daniel Pemberton
2018	Ribbon	"Human" by Rag'n'Bone Man
2019	Hoop	"Run Boy Run" by Woodkid
2019	Ball	"Beirut Taxi" by Alexandre Desplat
2019	Clubs	"The Darklands" by Daniel Pemberton
2019	Ribbon	"Makeba" by Jain
2020-2021	Hoop	"No Good" by Kaleo, Jökull Júlíusson
2020-2021	Ball	"Toxic" by Britney Spears
2020-2021	Clubs	"Hopak" by Igor Kornelyuk
2020-2021	Ribbon	"Bumble Bee Boogie" by Robert Wells
2022	Hoop	"Kalush Orchestra- Stephania" by Vinvicii
2022	Ball	
2022	Clubs	"Jungle Bill", "Houdini" by Yello
2022	Ribbon	
2023-2024	Hoop	"Kalush Orchestra- Stephania" by Vinvicii
2023-2024	Ball	"Tsunami (Jump) (Radio Edit) by DVBBS, Borgeous
2023-2024	Clubs	"Jungle Bill", "Houdini" by Yello
2023-2024	Ribbon	"Thunderstruck" by Hinder
2025	Hoop	"The Illusionist" by Maxime Rodriguez
2025	Ball	"Devil and Angel" by Maxime Rodriguez
2025	Clubs	"Mutation" by Cirque de Soleil
2025	Ribbon	"Rock Around The Clock" by Bill Haley

== Detailed Olympic results ==
Year	Competition Description	Location	Music	Apparatus	Rank-Final	Score-Final	Rank-Qualifying	Score-Qualifying
2018	Youth Olympics	Buenos Aires		All-around	2nd	65.100	3rd	62.050
2018	Youth Olympics	Buenos Aires	"Voodoo People" by The Prodigy, "Shallow Grave" by Steve Mason Experience	Hoop	2nd	17.750	2nd	17.000
2018	Youth Olympics	Buenos Aires	"Believer" by Chase Holfelder	Ball	6th	14.850	7th	15.350
2018	Youth Olympics	Buenos Aires	"Escape from East Berlin" by Daniel Pemberton	Clubs	2nd	16.950	3rd	16.450
2018	Youth Olympics	Buenos Aires	"Human" by Rag'n'Bone Man	Ribbon	2nd	15.550	8th	13.250

Year	Competition Description	Location	Music	Apparatus	Rank-Final	Score-Final	Rank-Qualifying	Score-Qualifying
2020	Olympics	Tokyo		All-around	9th	95.100	10th	93.100
2020	Olympics	Tokyo	"No Good" by Kaleo, Jökull Júlíusson	Hoop	8th	24.500	5th	24.600
2020	Olympics	Tokyo	"Toxic" by Britney Spears	Ball	8th	24.100	13th	23.800
2020	Olympics	Tokyo	"Hopak" by Igor Kornelyuk	Clubs	10th	24.900	6th	25.700
2020	Olympics	Tokyo	"Bumble Bee Boogie" by Robert Wells	Ribbon	7th	21.600	19th	19.000

== See also ==
- List of medalists at the Rhythmic Gymnastics Junior European Championships
