= 2018 Summer Gymnasiade =

- Host: Marrakesh
- Country: Morocco
- Opening: 2 May 2018
- Closing: 9 May 2018

The 18th Summer Gymnasiade was held in Marrakesh, Morocco, on 2–9 May 2018. It was held in 18 sports with 4000 school sport athletes.

== Sports ==
- Athletics ()
- Gymnastics ()
  - Artistic gymnastics
  - Rhythmic gymnastics
  - Aerobic gymnastics
- Swimming ()
- Archery ()
- Fencing ()
- Judo
- Karate
- Taekwondo
- Wrestling
- Chess
- Tennis
- Golf
- Petanque
- Boxing
- Surfing
- Cycling

== Medal table ==
30 countries gained at least one medal:

Rank	Nation	Gold	Silver	Bronze	Total
1	Ukraine	39	39	34	112
2	Morocco	33	23	32	88
3	Brazil	24	24	32	80
4	Chinese Taipei	23	15	28	66
5	Greece	16	5	13	34
6	France	14	27	14	55
7	China	13	11	18	42
8	Iran	13	3	1	17
9	Russia	8	11	14	33
10	Ireland	6	5	2	13
11	Hungary	5	12	9	26
12	Belarus	5	7	12	24
13	Turkey	5	6	16	27
14	Algeria	3	9	13	25
15	Romania	3	4	14	21
16	England	2	10	9	21
17	Hong Kong	2	4	3	9
18	Armenia	2	1	5	8
18	Spain	2	1	5	8
20	Cyprus	2	1	0	3
21	Tunisia	2	0	1	3
22	Portugal	1	2	3	6
23	Botswana	1	0	0	1
24	South Africa	0	2	4	6
25	Croatia	0	1	3	4
26	United States	0	1	2	3
27	United Arab Emirates	0	0	5	5
28	Azerbaijan	0	0	2	2
29	Niger	0	0	1	1
29	Oman	0	0	1	1
Totals (30 entries)		224	224	296	744
