= Tatyana Volozhanina =

Bulgarian rhythmic gymnast (born 2003)

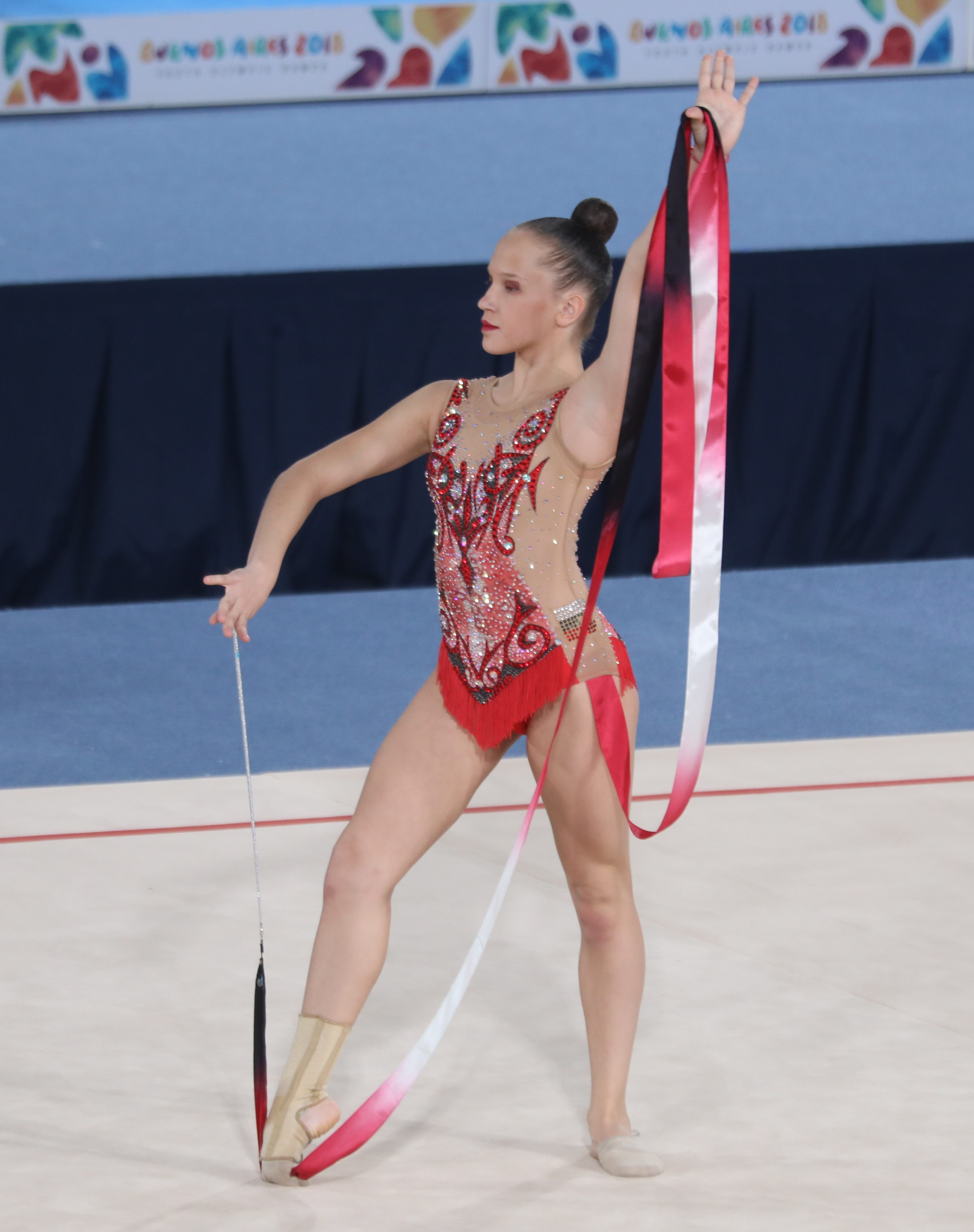

Personal information
- Full name: Tatyana Volozhanina
- Nickname: Tanya
- Born: 28 January 2003 (age 23) Irkutsk, Russia

Gymnastics career
- Discipline: Rhythmic gymnastics
- Country represented: Bulgaria; (2018 – 2023)
- Club: Levski Iliana
- Head coach: Branimira Markova
- Assistant coach: Silviya Stoyneva-Ruseva
Medal record
Representing Bulgaria
Rhythmic Gymnastics
Summer Universiade
Gold medal – first place	2021 Chengdu	Clubs
Bronze medal – third place	2021 Chengdu	Ball
Grand Prix Final
Silver medal – second place	2022 Brno	Hoop
Silver medal – second place	2022 Brno	Ball
Junior European Championships
Silver medal – second place	2018 Guadalajara	Hoop
Bronze medal – third place	2018 Guadalajara	Team

Tatyana Nikolaevna Volozhanina (Bulgarian: Татяна Воложанина; born 28 January 2003) is a retired Bulgarian individual rhythmic gymnast.

== Gymnastics career ==
She started training rhythmic gymnastics at the age of five in Irkutsk, Russia. In 2015, she moved to Bulgaria with her family. In January 2015 she received the title of Candidate for Master of Sport in the Russian Federation. In July 2017, International Gymnastics Federation allowed her to start competing for Bulgaria.

=== Junior ===
Her first major competition was the 2018 European Championships in Guadalajara, Spain. She competed with all four apparatuses and helped Bulgaria win bronze medal in Team competition. She also won silver medal in Hoop final and placed 5th in Ball, 6th in Clubs and 4th in Ribbon final. Later that year, she competed at the 2018 Youth Olympic Games in Buenos Aires, Argentina and placed 5th in All-around final.

=== Senior ===
She competed at the 2021 World Championships in Kitakyushu, Japan and placed 7th in All-around final. She also qualified to two apparatus finals, finishing 7th with Ball and 5th with Ribbon.

In July 2023, she represented Bulgaria at the 2021 Summer Universiade in Chengdu, China, which was postponed from 2021 to 2023 because of COVID-19 pandemic. She placed 8th in All-around and won two medals in Apparatus finals - gold in Club and bronze in Ball.

== Routine music information ==
Year	Apparatus	Music title
2018	Hoop	
2018	Ball	Une histoire d'amour by Mireille Mathieu
2018	Clubs	Pokor Lér by Saodaj'
2018	Ribbon	Tango Amore by Edvin Marton
2019	Hoop	Growing Up Londinium Daniel Pemberton
2019	Ball	Once Upon a December by Liz Callaway
2019	Clubs	Pokor Lér Saodaj'
2019	Ribbon	L'amore si Muove by Il Volo
2020	Hoop	Spartacus: Adagio of Spartacus and Phrygia by Wiener Philharmoniker & Aram Khachaturian
2020	Ball	Once Upon a December by Liz Callaway
2020	Clubs	Carpet Chase by Alan Menken
2020	Ribbon	L'amore si Muove by Il Volo
2021	Hoop (first)	Spartacus: Adagio of Spartacus and Phrygia by Wiener Philharmoniker & Aram Khachaturian
2021	Hoop (second)	Fearsome Flight by Cirque du Soleil
2021	Ball	Once Upon a December by Liz Callaway
2021	Clubs	Carpet Chase by Alan Menken
2021	Ribbon	L'amore si Muove by Il Volo
2022	Hoop (first)	Still Loving You by Sonata Arctica
2022	Hoop (second)	II Mio Rifugio by Nicola Cavallaro
2022	Ball	Perdona by Yasmin Levy
2022	Clubs (first)	O Mundo Vai by Ivete Sangalo
2022	Clubs (second)	L'Assasymphonie by Mozart, L'Opéra Rock
2022	Ribbon (first)	Od Ebra do Dunava by Barcelona Gipsy balKan Orchestra
2022	Ribbon (second)	(Where Do I Begin) Love Story by Shirley Bassey
2023	Hoop	The Phantom of the Opera by Nightwish
2023	Ball	Perdona by Yasmin Levy
2023	Clubs	Tosca, Act 3 ”E Lucevan le stelle” by Luciano Pavarotti and Orchestra of the Royal Opera House
2023	Ribbon	(Where Do I Begin) Love Story by Shirley Bassey

== See also ==
- List of medalists at the Rhythmic Gymnastics Junior European Championships
- Nationality changes in gymnastics
