= Gymnastics at the 2021 Summer World University Games =

International gymnastics championship event

Gymnastics at the Chengdu 2021 FISU World University Games
- Venues: Dong'an Lake Arena (artistic), Chengdu Sport University Gymnasium (rhythmic)
- Dates: July 31, 2023 – August 4, 2023 (artistic); July 29, 2023 – July 31, 2023 (rhythmic)

Artistic gymnastics was contested at the 2021 Summer World University Games from July 31 to August 4, 2023 (because of COVID-19 concerns) and was held at the Dong'an Lake Arena in Chengdu, China. Rhythmic gymnastics was contested from July 29 to 31 and was held at the Chengdu Sport University Gymnasium in Chengdu.

== Combinated medal table ==
* Host nation (China)

Rank	Nation	Gold	Silver	Bronze	Total
1	China*	11	6	1	18
2	Japan	3	6	9	18
3	Ukraine	3	2	1	6
4	Hungary	2	0	0	2
5	Kazakhstan	1	4	2	7
6	Chinese Taipei	1	1	2	4
7	Bulgaria	1	0	1	2
8	Azerbaijan	0	2	1	3
9	Germany	0	1	0	1
10	South Korea	0	0	2	2
11	Czech Republic	0	0	1	1
11	Spain	0	0	1	1
11	Turkey	0	0	1	1
Totals (13 entries)		22	22	22	66

== Artistic gymnastics ==
=== Nations ===
157 (105+52) from 36 Nations:

=== Men's events ===
Event	Gold	Silver	Bronze
Team all-around	China (CHN); Zou Jingyuan; Shi Cong; Su Weide; Lan Xingyu; Zhang Boheng	Japan (JPN); Daiki Hashimoto; Shohei Kawakami; Kazuma Kaya; Kazuki Minami; Kaito Sugimoto	South Korea (KOR); Ryu Sung-hyun; Kan Hyun-bae; Kim Jae-ho; Seo Jung-won; Lee Jung-hyo
Individual all-around	Zhang Boheng; China	Shi Cong; China	Kazuma Kaya; Japan
Floor	Kazuma Kaya; Japan	Milad Karimi; Kazakhstan	Ryu Sung-hyun; South Korea
Pommel horse	Lee Chih-kai; Chinese Taipei	Nariman Kurbanov; Kazakhstan	Shiao Yu-jan; Chinese Taipei
Rings	Lan Xingyu; China	Zou Jingyuan; China	Adem Asil; Turkey
Vault	Nazar Chepurnyi; Ukraine	Tseng Wei-sheng; Chinese Taipei	Milad Karimi; Kazakhstan
Parallel bars	Zou Jingyuan; China	Kaito Sugimoto; Japan	Kazuma Kaya; Japan
Horizontal bar	Milad Karimi; Kazakhstan	Shi Cong; China	Kaito Sugimoto; Japan

=== Women's events ===
Event	Gold	Silver	Bronze
Team all-around	China (CHN); Ou Yushan; Wei Xiaoyuan; Du Siyu; Zhang Jin; Luo Huan	Japan (JPN); Ayaka Sakaguchi; Shoko Miyata; Kokoro Fukasawa; Kohane Ushioku; Chiaki Hatakeda	Spain (ESP); Maria Llacer; Irene Calle; Lorena Medina; Carla Font
Individual all-around	Ou Yushan; China	Luo Huan; China	Ayaka Sakaguchi; Japan
Vault	Shoko Miyata; Japan	Ayaka Sakaguchi; Japan	Dominika Ponížilová; Czech Republic
Uneven bars	Du Siyu; China	Sophie Scheder; Germany	Luo Huan; China
Balance beam	Ou Yushan; China	Luo Huan; China	Ayaka Sakaguchi; Japan
Floor	Ou Yushan; China	Ayaka Sakaguchi; Japan	Shoko Miyata; Japan

=== Medal table ===
* Host nation (China)

Rank	Nation	Gold	Silver	Bronze	Total
1	China*	9	5	1	15
2	Japan	2	5	6	13
3	Kazakhstan	1	2	1	4
4	Chinese Taipei	1	1	1	3
5	Ukraine	1	0	0	1
6	Germany	0	1	0	1
7	South Korea	0	0	2	2
8	Czech Republic	0	0	1	1
8	Spain	0	0	1	1
8	Turkey	0	0	1	1
Totals (10 entries)		14	14	14	42

== Rhythmic gymnastics ==
=== Individual ===
Event	Gold	Silver	Bronze
All-around	Fanni Pigniczki; Hungary	Khrystyna Pohranychna; Ukraine	Reina Matsusaka; Japan
Hoop	Khrystyna Pohranychna; Ukraine	Zohra Aghamirova; Azerbaijan	Elzhana Taniyeva; Kazakhstan
Ball	Fanni Pigniczki; Hungary	Elzhana Taniyeva; Kazakhstan	Tatyana Volozhanina; Bulgaria
Clubs	Tatyana Volozhanina; Bulgaria	Zohra Aghamirova; Azerbaijan	Reina Matsusaka; Japan
Ribbon	Khrystyna Pohranychna; Ukraine	Elzhana Taniyeva; Kazakhstan	Zohra Aghamirova; Azerbaijan

=== Group ===
Event	Gold	Silver	Bronze
All-around	China (CHN); Chen Jiaqi; Chen Minshan; Li Xuerui; Xiao Mingxin; Yan Zhiting; Zhao Hongyu	Ukraine (UKR); Marta Borys; Diana Dovganiuk; Dariia Ivanyk; Nikol Krasiuk; Anastasiia Ptashnyk; Daria Shcherbakova	Japan (JPN); Kyoka Hayashi; Yuka Ishii; Saya Nishiyama; Yuri Shimada; Mio Takii
5 Hoops	China (CHN); Chen Jiaqi; Chen Minshan; Xiao Mingxin; Yan Zhiting; Zhao Hongyu	Japan (JPN); Kyoka Hayashi; Yuka Ishii; Saya Nishiyama; Yuri Shimada; Mio Takii	Ukraine (UKR); Marta Borys; Diana Dovganiuk; Dariia Ivanyk; Nikol Krasiuk; Anastasiia Ptashnyk
3 Ribbons + 2 Balls	Japan (JPN); Kyoka Hayashi; Yuka Ishii; Saya Nishiyama; Yuri Shimada; Mio Takii	China (CHN); Chen Jiaqi; Chen Minshan; Li Xuerui; Xiao Mingxin; Zhao Hongyu	Chinese Taipei (TPE); Chan Ting-chen; Lai Hsin-ya; Lo Yu-ching; Peng Fan-xi; Tsai Jui-shan

=== Medal table ===
* Host nation (China)

Rank	Nation	Gold	Silver	Bronze	Total
1	Ukraine	2	2	1	5
2	China*	2	1	0	3
3	Hungary	2	0	0	2
4	Japan	1	1	3	5
5	Bulgaria	1	0	1	2
6	Azerbaijan	0	2	1	3
6	Kazakhstan	0	2	1	3
8	Chinese Taipei	0	0	1	1
Totals (8 entries)		8	8	8	24

== Men's artistic events ==
=== All-around ===
Rank	Athlete	Floor (gymnastics)	Pommel horse	Rings (gymnastics)	Vault (gymnastics)	Parallel bars	Horizontal bar	Total
1st place, gold medalist(s)	Zhang Boheng (CHN)	14.500	14.500	14.700	14.733	15.400	12.900	86.733
2nd place, silver medalist(s)	Shi Cong (CHN)	13.833	14.333	14.400	14.666	14.700	14.466	86.398
3rd place, bronze medalist(s)	Kazuma Kaya (JPN)	12.900	14.266	13.866	14.366	14.700	14.000	84.098
4	Fred Richard (USA)	14.166	14.166	13.533	13.700	13.966	14.233	83.764
5	Milad Karimi (KAZ)	14.366	13.466	13.166	14.166	14.400	14.066	83.630
6	Joshua Karnes (USA)	13.866	13.333	12.866	14.733	14.533	13.333	82.664
7	Ryu Sung-hyun (KOR)	13.833	13.100	13.700	14.500	14.033	13.200	82.366
8	Lorenzo Bonicelli (ITA)	13.366	13.866	13.100	13.833	13.866	13.900	81.931
9	Lay Giannini (ITA)	13.300	12.800	13.233	14.233	14.300	13.600	81.466
10	Samir Serhani (SUI)	13.266	13.133	13.566	13.633	13.366	13.666	80.630
11	Nicolau Mir (ESP)	14.000	11.666	13.000	14.300	14.166	13.033	80.165
12	Ian Raubal (SUI)	13.366	12.000	13.566	13.500	14.233	13.466	80.131
13	Ivan Tikhonov (AZE)	13.466	13.933	13.500	14.000	13.433	11.666	79.998
14	Ilyas Azizov (KAZ)	13.133	13.533	12.600	14.033	13.200	13.133	79.632
15	Pantely Kolodii (UKR)	12.600	13.633	13.433	13.166	13.366	12.833	79.031
16	Alexander Kunz (GER)	12.800	12.633	12.233	14.200	12.166	12.866	76.898
17	Mehmet Koşak (TUR)	13.333	10.266	13.033	13.700	12.666	12.200	75.198
18	Daiki Hashimoto (JPN)	13.233	12.966	–	–	–	–	DNF

=== Floor exercise ===
Rank	Athlete	Score			Total
Rank	Athlete	D Score	E Score	Pen.	Total
1st place, gold medalist(s)	Kazuma Kaya (JPN)	5.7	8.633		14.333
2nd place, silver medalist(s)	Milad Karimi (KAZ)	6.3	8.100	0.1	14.300
3rd place, bronze medalist(s)	Ryu Sung-hyun (KOR)	6.3	8.000	0.4	13.900
4	Kazuki Minami (JPN)	6.4	7.333	0.1	13.633
5	Dmitriy Patanin (KAZ)	5.9	8.066	0.4	13.566
6	Lorenzo Bonicelli (ITA)	5.5	8.133	0.1	13.533
7	Niccolo Vannucchi (ITA)	6.1	6.700	0.1	12.700
8	Seo Jung-won (KOR)	5.3	7.000		12.300

=== Pommel horse ===
Rank	Athlete	Score			Total
Rank	Athlete	D Score	E Score	Pen.	Total
1st place, gold medalist(s)	Lee Chih-kai (TPE)	6.5	9.000		15.500
2nd place, silver medalist(s)	Nariman Kurbanov (KAZ)	6.3	8.966		15.266
3rd place, bronze medalist(s)	Shiao Yu-jan (TPE)	6.1	8.833		14.933
4	Kazuma Kaya (JPN)	6.5	8.133		14.633
5	Gagik Khachikyan (ARM)	6.2	7.666		13.866
6	Zou Jingyuan (CHN)	5.6	7.933		13.533
7	Lan Xingyu (CHN)	5.9	7.600		13.500
8	Ravshan Kamiljanov (UZB)	5.7	7.600		13.300

=== Rings ===
Rank	Athlete	Score			Total
Rank	Athlete	D Score	E Score	Pen.	Total
1st place, gold medalist(s)	Lan Xingyu (CHN)	6.4	8.966		15.366
2nd place, silver medalist(s)	Zou Jingyuan (CHN)	6.3	8.966		15.266
3rd place, bronze medalist(s)	Adem Asil (TUR)	6.3	8.633		14.933
4	Artur Avetisyan (ARM)	5.9	8.933		14.833
5	Nikita Simonov (AZE)	6.2	8.533		14.733
6	Vinzenz Höck (AUT)	5.1	8.433		14.533
7	Mehmet Koşak (TUR)	6.0	8.466		14.466
8	Mehdi Ahmadkohani (IRI)	6.0	7.766		13.766

=== Vault ===
Rank	Athlete	Vault	Score				Total
Rank	Athlete	Vault	D Score	E Score	Pen.	Score	Total
1st place, gold medalist(s)	Nazar Chepurnyi (UKR)	1	5.6	9.266		14.866	14.883
1st place, gold medalist(s)	Nazar Chepurnyi (UKR)	2	5.6	9.300		14.900	14.883
2nd place, silver medalist(s)	Tseng Wei-sheng (TPE)	1	5.6	8.966	0.1	14.466	14.416
2nd place, silver medalist(s)	Tseng Wei-sheng (TPE)	2	5.2	9.166		14.366	14.416
3rd place, bronze medalist(s)	Milad Karimi (KAZ)	1	5.6	8.733	0.1	14.233	14.366
3rd place, bronze medalist(s)	Milad Karimi (KAZ)	2	5.2	9.300		14.500	14.366
4	Niccolo Vannucchi (ITA)	1	5.6	8.733		14.333	14.266
4	Niccolo Vannucchi (ITA)	2	5.6	8.600		14.200	14.266
5	Adem Asil (TUR)	1	6.0	8.900	0.1	14.800	14.150
5	Adem Asil (TUR)	2	5.6	7.900		13.500	14.150
6	Pau Jiménez (ESP)	1	5.2	8.833		14.033	13.899
6	Pau Jiménez (ESP)	2	5.2	8.566		13.766	13.899
7	Kim Jae-ho (KOR)	1	5.6	7.900	0.3	13.200	13.866
7	Kim Jae-ho (KOR)	2	5.2	9.333		14.566	13.866
8	Asadbek Azamov (UZB)	1	5.2	7.866		13.066	DNF
8	Asadbek Azamov (UZB)	2	DNS	DNS		DNS	DNF

=== Parallel bars ===
Rank	Athlete	Score			Total
Rank	Athlete	D Score	E Score	Pen.	Total
1st place, gold medalist(s)	Zou Jingyuan (CHN)	6.9	9.166		16.066
2nd place, silver medalist(s)	Kaito Sugimoto (JPN)	6.3	8.600		14.900
3rd place, bronze medalist(s)	Kazuma Kaya (JPN)	6.3	8.533		14.833
4	Marco Sarrugerio (ITA)	5.8	8.566		14.366
5	Ryu Sung-hyun (KOR)	6.0	8.233		14.233
6	Nicolau Mir (ESP)	5.8	8.066		13.866
7	Dominic Tamsel (SUI)	5.8	7.800		13.600
8	Lay Giannini (ITA)	5.7	7.233		12.933

=== Horizontal bar ===
Rank	Athlete	Score			Total
Rank	Athlete	D Score	E Score	Pen.	Total
1st place, gold medalist(s)	Milad Karimi (KAZ)	6.3	8.500		14.800
2nd place, silver medalist(s)	Shi Cong (CHN)	6.3	8.300		14.600
3rd place, bronze medalist(s)	Kaito Sugimoto (JPN)	5.5	8.733		14.233
4	Dominic Tamsel (SUI)	5.3	8.466		13.766
5	Shohei Kawakami (JPN)	6.2	7.500		13.700
6	Lee Chih-kai (TPE)	5.1	8.566		13.666
7	Fred Richard (USA)	5.9	7.300	0.3	12.900
8	Taylor Christopulos (USA)	5.2	7.166		12.366

== Women's artistic events ==
=== All-around ===
Rank	Athlete	Vault (gymnastics)	Uneven bars	Balance beam	Floor (gymnastics)	Total
1st place, gold medalist(s)	Ou Yushan (CHN)	12.933	13.833	14.166	13.566	54.498
2nd place, silver medalist(s)	Luo Huan (CHN)	12.933	13.933	14.033	12.866	53.765
3rd place, bronze medalist(s)	Ayaka Sakaguchi (JPN)	13.766	13.133	13.200	13.066	53.165
4	Lorena Medina (ESP)	12.866	12.566	12.300	12.033	49.765
5	Maia Llacer (ESP)	12.966	12.900	11.166	12.533	49.565
6	Tisha Volleman (NED)	13.000	13.000	10.466	13.000	49.466
7	Dominika Ponížilová (CZE)	13.000	12.033	12.233	12.000	49.266
8	Lee Da-yeong (KOR)	13.000	12.533	10.933	12.233	48.699
9	İlayda Şahin (TUR)	12.900	12.166	11.666	11.533	48.265
10	Bianca Frysak (AUT)	12.633	11.400	12.400	11.766	48.199
11	Aiyu Zhu (GER)	12.833	11.866	11.633	11.700	48.032
12	Amanda Edwards (AUS)	12.333	11.000	12.300	12.133	47.766
13	Lai Pin-ju (TPE)	12.766	11.600	11.100	11.933	47.399
14	Yun Bo-eun (KOR)	12.833	11.833	10.900	11.600	47.166
15	Ting Hua-tien (TPE)	11.966	9.966	12.766	11.900	46.598
16	Bilge Tarhan (TUR)	13.000	10.066	11.266	12.133	46.465
17	Elisabeth Wagner (GER)	11.933	11.100	11.333	11.533	45.899
18	Shoko Miyata (JPN)	13.900	12.033	13.766	–	DNF

=== Vault ===
Rank	Athlete	Vault	Score				Total
Rank	Athlete	Vault	D Score	E Score	Pen.	Score	Total
1st place, gold medalist(s)	Shoko Miyata (JPN)	1	5.0	8.900		13.900	13.800
1st place, gold medalist(s)	Shoko Miyata (JPN)	2	4.8	8.900		13.700	13.800
2nd place, silver medalist(s)	Ayaka Sakaguchi (JPN)	1	5.0	8.833		13.833	13.433
2nd place, silver medalist(s)	Ayaka Sakaguchi (JPN)	2	4.4	8.633		13.033	13.433
3rd place, bronze medalist(s)	Dominika Ponížilová (CZE)	1	4.4	8.833		13.233	12.866
3rd place, bronze medalist(s)	Dominika Ponížilová (CZE)	2	3.8	8.700		12.500	12.866
4	Bilge Tarhan (TUR)	1	4.2	8.800		13.000	12.850
4	Bilge Tarhan (TUR)	2	4.0	8.700		12.700	12.850
5	Kim Seo-hyeon (KOR)	1	4.2	8.900		13.100	12.833
5	Kim Seo-hyeon (KOR)	2	3.8	8.766		12.566	12.833
6	Gulnaz Jumabekova (UZB)	1	4.2	8.600		12.800	12.566
6	Gulnaz Jumabekova (UZB)	2	3.6	8.733		12.333	12.566
7	Lai Pin-ju (TPE)	1	4.2	8.800		13.000	12.516
7	Lai Pin-ju (TPE)	2	3.4	8.633		12.033	12.516
8	Wu Sing-fen (TPE)	1	4.4	8.600		13.000	12.250
8	Wu Sing-fen (TPE)	2	4.0	7.500		11.500	12.250

=== Uneven bars ===
Rank	Athlete	Score			Total
Rank	Athlete	D Score	E Score	Pen.	Total
1st place, gold medalist(s)	Du Siyu (CHN)	5.8	8.033		13.833
2nd place, silver medalist(s)	Sophie Scheder (GER)	5.3	8.133		13.433
3rd place, bronze medalist(s)	Luo Huan (CHN)	6.0	7.000		13.000
4	Ayaka Sakaguchi (JPN)	5.1	7.800		12.900
5	Maia Llacer (ESP)	5.4	7.466		12.866
6	Tisha Volleman (NED)	5.5	7.200		12.700
7	Bianca Frysak (AUT)	4.8	7.633		12.433
8	Barbora Mokošová (SVK)	4.7	5.400	0.3	9.800

=== Balance beam ===
Rank	Athlete	Score			Total
Rank	Athlete	D Score	E Score	Pen.	Total
1st place, gold medalist(s)	Ou Yushan (CHN)	6.2	8.166		14.366
2nd place, silver medalist(s)	Luo Huan (CHN)	5.9	8.066		13.966
3rd place, bronze medalist(s)	Ayaka Sakaguchi (JPN)	5.6	7.866		13.466
4	Shoko Miyata (JPN)	5.7	7.600		13.300
5	Bianca Frysak (AUT)	4.4	8.000		12.400
6	Lee Da-yeong (KOR)	4.7	7.700		12.400
7	Barbora Mokošová (SVK)	4.4	7.766		12.166
8	Wu Sing-fen (TPE)	4.7	6.800	0.1	11.400

=== Floor exercise ===
Rank	Athlete	Score			Total
Rank	Athlete	D Score	E Score	Pen.	Total
1st place, gold medalist(s)	Ou Yushan (CHN)	5.8	8.066		13.866
2nd place, silver medalist(s)	Ayaka Sakaguchi (JPN)	5.2	8.133		13.333
3rd place, bronze medalist(s)	Shoko Miyata (JPN)	5.3	8.033		13.333
4	Tisha Volleman (NED)	5.3	7.733		13.033
5	Bianca Frysak (AUT)	4.4	7.966		12.366
6	Lee Da-yeong (KOR)	4.9	7.466		12.366
7	Zhang Jin (CHN)	5.4	6.966		12.366
8	Maia Llacer (ESP)	4.6	7.133	0.1	11.633
