= Roman Petruk =

Ukrainian high jumper

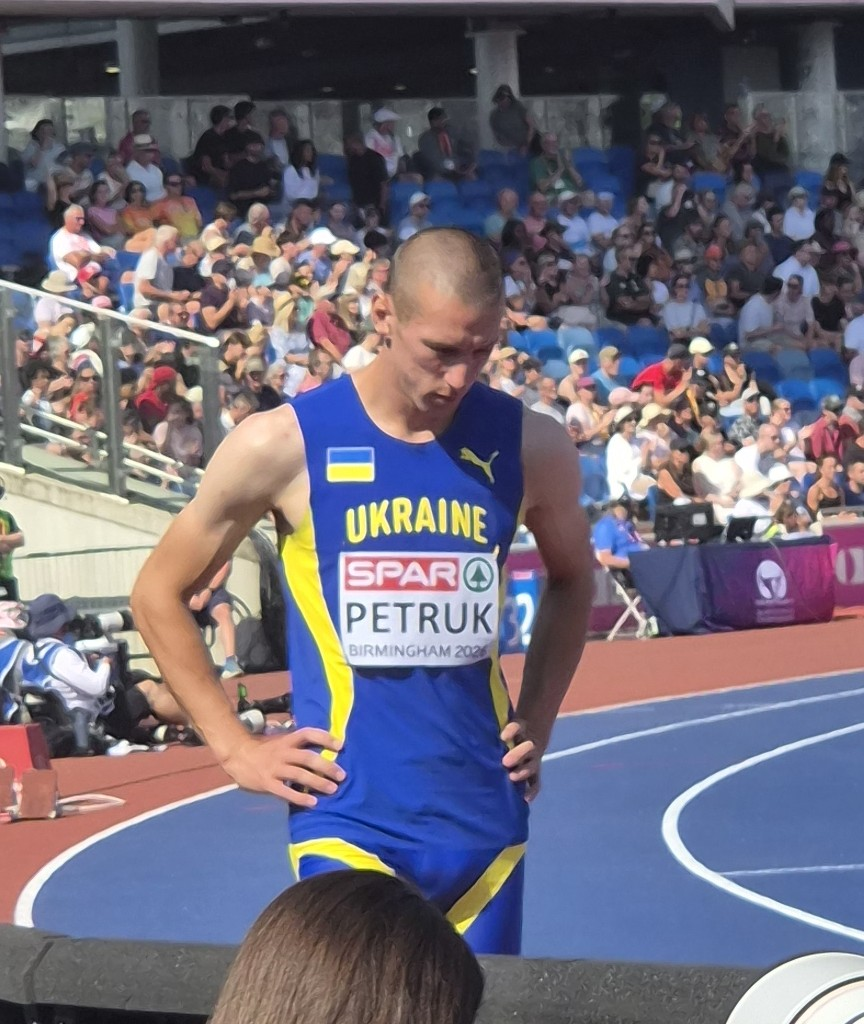
- 2026 European Championships

Personal information
- Native name: Роман Петрук
- Born: 9 November 2003 (age 22) Berdychiv, Ukraine

Sport
- Coached by: Serhiy Sheremeta
Medal record
Men's athletics
Representing Ukraine
Summer World University Games
Bronze medal – third place	2021 Chengdu	High jump
European Athletics U23 Championships
Silver medal – second place	2023 Espoo	High jump
European Youth Olympic Festival
Bronze medal – third place	2019 Baku	High jump

Roman Petruk (Ukrainian: Роман Петрук; born 9 November 2003) is a Ukrainian high jumper. He received a bronze medal at the 2021 Summer World University Games and a silver at the 2023 European Athletics U23 Championships.

As of July 2024, Petruck is currently serving a 16-month competition ban due to an anti-doping violation.

== Career ==
Petruk won the bronze medal at the 2019 European Youth Summer Olympic Festival, reaching 2.10 meters.

He also competed at the 2021 European Athletics U20 Championships and the 2021 World Athletics U20 Championships, among other competitions, without reaching the medals. He was runner-up at Ukrainian National Championships in September 2022 in Lutsk.

In February 2023, Petruk achieved his personal best jump of 2.26 meters. In August, he won silver medal at the 2023 European Athletics U20 Championships, where he reached 2.19 meters, sharing the runner-up spot with compatriot Oleh Doroshchuk on count-back. Later that month, he competed at the delayed 2021 Summer World University Games held in Chengdu in August 2023, where he won a bronze medal, reaching 2.20 meters.

== Doping violation ==
In May 2024, Petruk was issued with a 16-month competition ban after testing positive for torasemide in contravention of anti-doping rules. All of his results from 18 December 2023 were disqualified and his ban will run from Dec 2023 to June 2025.
