= Diving at the 2026 European Aquatics Championships – Women's 3 m springboard =

Women's 3 m springboard at the 2026 European Aquatics Championships
- Venue: Paris Aquatic Centre
- Dates: 4 August
- Competitors: 27 from 20 nations
- Winning points: 358.05

Medalists
gold medal	Chiara Pellacani	Italy
silver medal	Yasmin Harper	Great Britain
bronze medal	Nadezhda Trifonova

The Women's 3 m springboard competition at the 2026 European Aquatics Championships was held on 4 August 2026.

== Results ==
The preliminary round was started at 12:30. The final was started at 21:15.

Green denotes finalists

Rank	Diver	Nationality	Preliminary		Final	
Rank	Diver	Nationality	Points	Rank	Points	Rank
1st place, gold medalist(s)	Chiara Pellacani	Italy	336.85	1	358.05	1
2nd place, silver medalist(s)	Yasmin Harper	Great Britain	270.00	10	318.70	2
3rd place, bronze medalist(s)	Nadezhda Trifonova	Neutral Athletes B	303.70	2	312.40	3
4	Elisa Pizzini	Italy	268.60	12	306.25	4
5	Lena Hentschel	Germany	280.55	7	297.65	5
6	Jette Müller	Germany	276.50	8	287.00	6
7	Desharne Bent-Ashmeil	Great Britain	291.30	4	283.95	7
8	Kaja Skrzek	Poland	274.80	9	281.05	8
9	Elizaveta Kuzina	Neutral Athletes B	282.45	6	273.50	9
10	Kseniia Bochek	Ukraine	269.90	11	260.00	10
11	Aleksandra Bibikina	Armenia	286.35	5	259.30	11
12	Michelle Heimberg	Switzerland	300.20	3	Withdrawn	
13	Elna Widerström	Sweden	267.30	13	Did not advance	
14	Juliette Landi	France	247.30	14	Did not advance	
15	Amélie Bayol	France	244.35	15	Did not advance	
16	Oona Abbema	Netherlands	242.95	16	Did not advance	
17	Aleksandra Błażowska	Poland	238.30	17	Did not advance	
18	Amelie Foerster	Romania	234.15	18	Did not advance	
19	Aliaksandra Puz	Neutral Athletes A	230.05	19	Did not advance	
20	Tereza Jelínková	Czechia	217.20	20	Did not advance	
21	Luisa Arco	Portugal	212.90	21	Did not advance	
22	Diana Karnafel	Ukraine	212.25	22	Did not advance	
23	Valeria Antolino	Spain	208.25	23	Did not advance	
24	Caroline Kupka	Norway	187.70	24	Did not advance	
25	Belissima Aydın	Turkey	187.05	25	Did not advance	
26	Patrícia Kun	Hungary	184.70	26	Did not advance	
27	Tekle Sharia	Georgia	168.65	27	Did not advance	
