= Diving at the 2025 World Aquatics Championships – Women's synchronized 3 metre springboard =

Women's synchronized 3 metre springboard at the Diving at the 2025 World Aquatics Championships
- Venue: OCBC Aquatic Centre
- Location: Singapore
- Dates: 29 July (preliminaries and final)
- Competitors: 46 from 23 nations
- Teams: 23
- Winning points: 325.20

Medalists
gold medal	Chen Jia; Chen Yiwen	China
silver medal	Yasmin Harper; Scarlett Mew Jensen	Great Britain
bronze medal	Lía Cueva; Mía Cueva	Mexico

The Women's synchronized 3 metre springboard competition at the 2025 World Aquatics Championships was held on 29 July 2025.

== Results ==
The preliminary round was started at 09:02. The final round was started at 15:32.

Green denotes finalists

Rank	Nation	Preliminary		Final	
Rank	Nation	Points	Rank	Points	Rank
1st place, gold medalist(s)	China; Chen Jia; Chen Yiwen	310.68	1	325.20	1
2nd place, silver medalist(s)	Great Britain; Yasmin Harper; Scarlett Mew Jensen	294.03	2	298.35	2
3rd place, bronze medalist(s)	Mexico; Lía Cueva; Mía Cueva	268.38	4	294.36	3
4	Australia; Maddison Keeney; Alysha Koloi	269.28	3	285.18	4
5	Italy; Chiara Pellacani; Elisa Pizzini	262.56	5	279.27	5
6	Germany; Lena Hentschel; Jette Müller	258.15	7	268.17	6
7	United States; Bailee Sturgill; Lily Witte	260.88	6	261.18	7
8	Ukraine; Kseniia Bochek; Diana Karnafel	249.54	8	260.88	8
9	Brazil; Luana Lira; Anna Lúcia dos Santos	246.60	9	Did not advance	
10	Canada; Amélie-Laura Jasmin; Sonya Palkhivala	243.00	10	Did not advance	
11	Poland; Aleksandra Błażowska; Kaja Skrzek	239.40	11	Did not advance	
12	North Korea; Kim Ji-hye; Kim Mi-hwa	230.85	12	Did not advance	
13	South Korea; Jung Da-yeon; Lee Ye-joo	229.53	13	Did not advance	
14	South Africa; Bailey Heydra; Zalika Methula	214.17	14	Did not advance	
15	Singapore; Clara Liaw; Alycia Lim	211.83	15	Did not advance	
16	Neutral Athletes B Kristina Ilinykh; Elizaveta Kuzina	208.80	16	Did not advance	
17	Czech Republic; Tereza Jelínková; Ivana Medková	206.31	17	Did not advance	
18	Chinese Taipei; Barbara Chen; Jacqueline Chen	203.73	18	Did not advance	
19	Hong Kong; Chan Tsz Ming; Angel Wang	202.80	19	Did not advance	
20	Sweden; Nina Janmyr; Elna Widerström	188.61	20	Did not advance	
21	Indonesia; Gladies Lariesa Garina; Nur Mufiidah Sudirman	179.37	21	Did not advance	
22	Georgia; Mariam Shanidze; Tekle Sharia	160.53	22	Did not advance	
23	Macau; Wong Cho Yi; Leong Ian I	117.27	23	Did not advance	
