= Diving at the 2025 World Aquatics Championships – Women's 3 metre springboard =

Women's 3 metre springboard at the Diving at the 2025 World Aquatics Championships
- Venue: OCBC Aquatic Centre
- Location: Singapore
- Dates: 1 August (preliminaries); 2 August (semifinal and final)
- Competitors: 52 from 32 nations
- Winning points: 389.70

Medalists
gold medal	Chen Yiwen	China
silver medal	Chen Jia	China
bronze medal	Chiara Pellacani	Italy

The Women's 3 metre springboard competition at the 2025 World Aquatics Championships was held on 1 and 2 August 2025.

== Results ==
The preliminary round was started on 1 August at 09:02. The semifinal was started on 2 August at 15:02. The final was started on 2 August at 18:02.

Green denotes finalists

Blue denotes semifinalists

Rank	Diver	Nationality	Preliminary		Semifinal		Final	
Rank	Diver	Nationality	Points	Rank	Points	Rank	Points	Rank
1st place, gold medalist(s)	Chen Yiwen	China	323.30	2	358.05	1	389.70	1
2nd place, silver medalist(s)	Chen Jia	China	342.95	1	347.40	2	356.40	2
3rd place, bronze medalist(s)	Chiara Pellacani	Italy	302.05	6	310.80	4	323.20	3
4	Lena Hentschel	Germany	268.85	17	287.05	8	321.60	4
5	Sayaka Mikami	Japan	283.75	12	300.45	7	320.15	5
6	Maddison Keeney	Australia	291.80	7	317.30	3	310.60	6
7	Kristina Ilinykh	Neutral Athletes B	291.00	9	308.30	5	310.30	7
8	Michelle Heimberg	Switzerland	303.45	4	282.15	11	309.45	8
9	Aranza Vázquez	Mexico	303.45	4	304.80	6	297.45	9
10	Elisa Pizzini	Italy	277.70	15	283.80	9	280.80	10
11	Amélie-Laura Jasmin	Canada	290.10	10	282.40	10	271.50	11
12	María García	Mexico	270.45	16	279.50	12	270.55	12
13	Jette Müller	Germany	268.65	18	279.40	13	Did not advance	
14	Grace Reid	Great Britain	283.90	11	277.65	14	Did not advance	
15	Sophie Verzyl	United States	307.15	3	255.55	15	Did not advance	
16	Anisley García	Cuba	278.70	13	248.30	16	Did not advance	
17	Aleksandra Bibikina	Armenia	291.30	8	239.10	17	Did not advance	
18	Jung Da-yeon	South Korea	277.75	14	226.30	18	Did not advance	
19	Maha Eissa	Egypt	261.45	19	Did not advance			
20	Margo Erlam	Canada	260.10	20	Did not advance			
21	Kaja Skrzek	Poland	259.60	21	Did not advance			
22	Naïs Gillet	France	259.55	22	Did not advance			
23	Kseniia Bochek	Ukraine	259.20	23	Did not advance			
24	Viviana Uribe	Colombia	256.05	24	Did not advance			
25	Lily Witte	United States	255.45	25	Did not advance			
26	Luana Lira	Brazil	252.30	26	Did not advance			
27	Elna Widerström	Sweden	249.80	27	Did not advance			
28	Elizaveta Kuzina	Neutral Athletes B	249.20	28	Did not advance			
29	Bailey Heydra	South Africa	242.40	29	Did not advance			
30	Tereza Jelínková	Czech Republic	237.70	30	Did not advance			
30	Aleksandra Błażowska	Poland	237.70	30	Did not advance			
32	Juliette Landi	France	234.35	32	Did not advance			
33	Amy Rollinson	Great Britain	230.70	33	Did not advance			
34	Ana Ricci	Peru	229.10	34	Did not advance			
35	Georgia Sheehan	Australia	228.25	35	Did not advance			
36	Caroline Kupka	Norway	224.95	36	Did not advance			
37	Ariana Drake	Philippines	223.95	37	Did not advance			
38	Gladies Lariesa Garina	Indonesia	220.10	38	Did not advance			
39	Jacqueline Chen	Chinese Taipei	212.35	39	Did not advance			
40	Clara Liaw	Singapore	210.60	40	Did not advance			
41	Barbara Chen	Chinese Taipei	205.35	41	Did not advance			
42	Nina Janmyr	Sweden	205.10	42	Did not advance			
43	Anna Lúcia dos Santos	Brazil	198.40	43	Did not advance			
44	Lee Ye-joo	South Korea	197.15	44	Did not advance			
45	Mariam Shanidze	Georgia	195.85	45	Did not advance			
46	Fong Kay Yian	Singapore	193.25	46	Did not advance			
47	Chan Tsz Ming	Hong Kong	187.95	47	Did not advance			
48	Ivana Medková	Czech Republic	182.55	48	Did not advance			
49	Leung Ka Sin	Hong Kong	153.50	49	Did not advance			
50	Zalika Methula	South Africa	153.00	50	Did not advance			
51	Shravani Suryawanshi	India	138.90	51	Did not advance			
52	Palak Sharma	India	127.95	52	Did not advance			
	Diana Karnafel	Ukraine	Did not start					
