= Diving at the 2020 European Aquatics Championships – Women's 1 m springboard =

Women's 1 m springboard at the 2020 European Aquatics Championships
- Venue: Danube Arena
- Dates: 11 May 2021
- Competitors: 31 from 19 nations
- Winning points: 259.90

Medalists
gold medal	Elena Bertocchi	Italy
silver medal	Michelle Heimberg	Switzerland
bronze medal	Chiara Pellacani	Italy

The Women's 1 m springboard competition of the 2020 European Aquatics Championships was held on 11 May 2021.

== Results ==
The preliminary round was started at 12:30. The final was held at 20:20.

Green denotes finalists

Rank	Diver	Nationality	Preliminary		Final	
Rank	Diver	Nationality	Points	Rank	Points	Rank
1st place, gold medalist(s)	Elena Bertocchi	Italy	258.10	2	259.90	1
2nd place, silver medalist(s)	Michelle Heimberg	Switzerland	258.45	1	255.55	2
3rd place, bronze medalist(s)	Chiara Pellacani	Italy	254.80	3	254.15	3
4	Kristina Ilinykh	Russia	245.90	4	249.30	4
5	Emilia Nilsson Garip	Sweden	240.95	8	248.50	5
6	Maria Polyakova	Russia	241.60	6	247.35	6
7	Hanna Pysmenska	Ukraine	245.30	5	242.45	7
8	Clare Cryan	Ireland	241.60	6	234.30	8
9	Katherine Torrance	Great Britain	238.30	9	232.50	9
10	Naïs Gillet	France	231.75	12	214.10	10
11	Saskia Oettinghaus	Germany	235.50	10	213.75	11
12	Alena Khamulkina	Belarus	234.05	11	204.00	12
13	Lena Hentschel	Germany	230.95	13	did not advance	
14	Emma Gullstrand	Sweden	230.55	14	did not advance	
15	Rocío Velázquez	Spain	223.50	15	did not advance	
16	Jade Gillet	France	223.30	16	did not advance	
17	Kaja Skrzek	Poland	221.80	17	did not advance	
18	Madeline Coquoz	Switzerland	218.90	18	did not advance	
19	Valeria Antolino	Spain	217.75	19	did not advance	
20	Laura Valore	Denmark	213.10	20	did not advance	
21	Anna Arnautova	Ukraine	208.70	21	did not advance	
22	Oona Abbema	Netherlands	208.10	22	did not advance	
23	Yasmin Harper	Great Britain	205.50	23	did not advance	
24	Caroline Kupka	Norway	203.65	24	did not advance	
25	Anne Tuxen	Norway	185.30	25	did not advance	
25	Daphne Wils	Netherlands	185.30	25	did not advance	
27	Petra Sándor	Hungary	181.65	27	did not advance	
28	Marcela Marić	Croatia	174.50	28	did not advance	
29	Patrícia Kun	Hungary	172.35	29	did not advance	
30	Zora Opalka	Slovakia	170.50	30	did not advance	
31	Cara Albiez	Austria	169.70	31	did not advance	
