= Diving at the 2022 European Aquatics Championships – Women's 1 m springboard =

Women's 1 m springboard at the 2022 European Aquatics Championships
- Venue: Foro Italico
- Dates: 16 August
- Competitors: 24 from 17 nations
- Winning points: 264.25

Medalists
gold medal	Elena Bertocchi	Italy
silver medal	Emma Gullstrand	Sweden
bronze medal	Chiara Pellacani	Italy

The Women's 1 m springboard competition of the 2022 European Aquatics Championships was held on 16 August 2022.

== Results ==
The preliminary round was started at 12:00. The final was held at 15:10.

Green denotes finalists

Rank	Diver	Nationality	Preliminary		Final	
Rank	Diver	Nationality	Points	Rank	Points	Rank
1st place, gold medalist(s)	Elena Bertocchi	Italy	256.65	1	264.25	1
2nd place, silver medalist(s)	Emma Gullstrand	Sweden	240.15	7	259.65	2
3rd place, bronze medalist(s)	Chiara Pellacani	Italy	254.25	2	259.05	3
4	Jette Müller	Germany	228.00	9	248.05	4
5	Emilia Nilsson	Sweden	242.25	6	243.90	5
6	Yasmin Harper	Great Britain	243.00	5	242.20	6
7	Michelle Heimberg	Switzerland	250.50	3	240.45	7
8	Daphne Wils	Netherlands	245.15	4	235.75	8
9	Naïs Gillet	France	225.45	11	229.25	9
10	Anna Arnautova	Ukraine	225.80	10	228.10	10
11	Clare Cryan	Ireland	230.40	8	227.75	11
12	Madeline Coquoz	Switzerland	222.80	12	221.95	12
13	Caroline Kupka	Norway	217.95	13	Did not advance	
14	Saskia Oettinghaus	Germany	216.90	14	Did not advance	
15	Rocío Velázquez	Spain	216.55	15	Did not advance	
16	Aleksandra Błażowska	Poland	210.95	16	Did not advance	
17	Anne Tuxen	Norway	210.90	17	Did not advance	
18	Laura Valore	Denmark	208.35	18	Did not advance	
19	Džeja Patrika	Latvia	202.95	19	Did not advance	
20	Scarlett Mew Jensen	Great Britain	198.35	20	Did not advance	
21	Amelie-Enya Forster	Romania	191.25	21	Did not advance	
22	Lauren Hallaselkä	Finland	182.20	22	Did not advance	
23	Estilla Mosena	Hungary	181.80	23	Did not advance	
	Kaja Skrzek	Poland	Did not finish		Did not advance	
