= Ukraine at the 2025 World Aquatics Championships =

- Flag of Ukraine
- World Aquatics code: UKR
- National federation: Ukrainian Swimming Federation
- Website: usf.org.ua

in Singapore
- Competitors: 26 in 4 sports
- Medals Ranked 25th: Gold 0 Silver 1 Bronze 0 Total 1

World Aquatics Championships appearances
- 1994; 1998; 2001; 2003; 2005; 2007; 2009; 2011; 2013; 2015; 2017; 2019; 2022; 2023; 2024; 2025

Other related appearances
- Soviet Union (1973–1991)

Ukraine competed at the 2025 World Aquatics Championships in Singapore from July 11 to August 3, 2025.

== Medalists ==
Medal	Name	Sport	Event	Date
2nd place, silver medalist(s)	Oleksiy Sereda	Diving	Men's 10 metre platform	3 August 2025

== Competitors ==
The following is the list of competitors in the Championships.

Sport	Men	Women	Total
Artistic swimming	0	9	9
Diving	6	4	10
High diving	1	0	1
Swimming	6	0	6
Total	13	13	26

== Artistic swimming ==
Women

Athlete	Event	Preliminaries		Final	
Athlete	Event	Points	Rank	Points	Rank
Daria Moshynska; Anastasiia Shmonina	Duet technical routine	267.5208	10 Q	273.4933	9
Daria Moshynska; Anastasiia Shmonina	Duet free routine	251.0959	7 Q	231.2713	10

Mixed

Athlete	Event	Preliminaries		Final	
Athlete	Event	Points	Rank	Points	Rank
Oleksandra Goretska; Mariia Hrynishyna; Uliana Hrynishyna; Alisa Kulyk; Yelyzaveta Lymar; Daria Moshynska; Anastasiia Shmonina; Mariia Zachepa	Team technical routine	268.9901	5 Q	273.0525	7
Oleksandra Goretska; Uliana Hrynishyna; Alisa Kulyk; Yelyzaveta Lymar; Daria Moshynska; Anastasiia Shmonina; Mariia Zachepa; Mariia Zdorovtsova	Team acrobatic routine	210.1837	5 Q	209.1731	7

== Diving ==
Men

Athlete	Event	Preliminaries		Semifinals		Final	
Athlete	Event	Points	Rank	Points	Rank	Points	Rank
Kirill Boliukh	3 m springboard	344.60	36	Did not advance			
Bohdan Chyzhovskyi	1 m springboard	351.00	11 Q	—N/a		316.40	12
Bohdan Chyzhovskyi	3 m springboard	387.65	13 Q	341.70	18	Did not advance	
Mark Hrytsenko	10 m platform	418.30	12 Q	405.35	15	Did not advance	
Danylo Konovalov	1 m springboard	343.75	15	—N/a		Did not advance	
Oleksiy Sereda	10 m platform	447.35	7 Q	471.80	5 Q	515.20	2nd place, silver medalist(s)
Kirill Boliukh; Stanislav Oliferchyk	3 m synchro springboard	374.91	7 Q	—N/a		387.99	4
Mark Hrytsenko; Oleksiy Sereda	10 m synchro platform	392.49	5 Q	—N/a		391.23	5

Women

Athlete	Event	Preliminaries		Semifinals		Final	
Athlete	Event	Points	Rank	Points	Rank	Points	Rank
Kseniia Bochek	1 m springboard	186.55	44	—N/a		Did not advance	
Kseniia Bochek	3 m springboard	259.20	23	Did not advance			
Diana Karnafel	1 m springboard	Withdrawn		—N/a		Did not advance	
Diana Karnafel	3 m springboard	Did not start		Did not advance			
Sofiya Lyskun	10 m platform	255.95	19	Did not advance			
Kseniia Bochek; Diana Karnafel	3 m synchro springboard	249.54	8 Q	—N/a		260.88	8
Kseniya Baylo; Sofiya Lyskun	10 m synchro platform	270.00	10	—N/a		Did not advance	

Mixed

Athlete	Event	Final	
Athlete	Event	Points	Rank
Kirill Boliukh; Kseniya Baylo	10 m synchro platform	294.66	6
Kirill Boliukh; Oleksiy Sereda; Kseniya Baylo; Sofiya Lyskun	Team event	361.45	7

== High diving ==
Ukraine entered 1 high diver.

Men

Athlete	Event	Preliminaries		Final	
Athlete	Event	Points	Rank	Points	Rank
Oleksiy Pryhorov	Men's high diving	357.65	9 Q	359.90	9

== Swimming ==
Ukraine entered 6 swimmers.

Men

Athlete	Event	Heat		Semi-final		Final	
Athlete	Event	Time	Rank	Time	Rank	Time	Rank
Stepan Babenko	50 m breaststroke	27.39	26	Did not advance			
Vladyslav Bukhov	50 m freestyle	21.83	11 Q	21.82	13	Did not advance	
Vladyslav Bukhov	100 m freestyle	50.43	47	Did not advance			
Denys Kesil	100 m butterfly	53.05	38	Did not advance			
Denys Kesil	200 m butterfly	1:56.51	18	Did not advance			
Denys Kesil	200 m individual medley	2:02.86	31	Did not advance			
Volodymyr Lisovets	50 m breaststroke	27.22	17	Did not advance			
Volodymyr Lisovets	100 m breaststroke	1:00.81	24	Did not advance			
Maksym Ovchinnikov	200 m breaststroke	2:11.07	11 Q	2:10.95	14	Did not advance	
Oleksandr Zheltyakov	50 m backstroke	25.64	41	Did not advance			
Oleksandr Zheltyakov	100 m backstroke	54.24	24	Did not advance			
Oleksandr Zheltyakov	200 m backstroke	2:02.17	33	Did not advance			
Oleksandr Zheltyakov; Volodymyr Lisovets; Denys Kesil; Vladyslav Bukhov	4 × 100 m medley relay	Did not start		—N/a		Did not advance	
