= Diving at the 2026 European Aquatics Championships – Women's 3 m synchro springboard =

Women's 3 m synchro springboard at the 2026 European Aquatics Championships
- Venue: Paris Aquatic Centre
- Dates: 6 August
- Competitors: 12 from 6 nations
- Teams: 6
- Winning points: 308.07

Medalists
gold medal	Chiara Pellacani; Elisa Pizzini	Italy
silver medal	Kseniia Bochek; Diana Karnafel	Ukraine
bronze medal	Lena Hentschel; Jette Müller	Germany

The Women's 3 m synchro springboard competition at the 2026 European Aquatics Championships was held on 6 August 2026.

== Results ==
The final was started at 17:30.

Rank	Nation	Points					
Rank	Nation	D1	D2	D3	D4	D5	Total
1st place, gold medalist(s)	Italy; Chiara Pellacani; Elisa Pizzini	48.00	46.20	70.20	73.47	70.20	308.07
2nd place, silver medalist(s)	Ukraine; Kseniia Bochek; Diana Karnafel	45.60	43.80	55.80	68.40	64.80	278.40
3rd place, bronze medalist(s)	Germany; Lena Hentschel; Jette Müller	48.00	48.60	67.50	49.29	61.20	274.59
4	Neutral Athletes B Uliana Kliueva; Nadezhda Trifonova	48.00	39.60	53.10	67.50	57.60	265.80
5	Poland; Aleksandra Błażowska; Kaja Skrzek	46.20	42.60	63.90	54.87	53.10	260.67
	Great Britain; Yasmin Harper; Scarlett Mew Jensen	49.20	0.00	0.00	Withdrawn		
