= Diving at the 2022 European Aquatics Championships – Women's 3 m springboard =

Women's 3 m springboard at the 2022 European Aquatics Championships
- Venue: Foro Italico
- Dates: 19 August
- Competitors: 23 from 14 nations
- Winning points: 318.75

Medalists
gold medal	Chiara Pellacani	Italy
silver medal	Michelle Heimberg	Switzerland
bronze medal	Yasmin Harper	Great Britain

The Women's 3 m springboard competition of the 2022 European Aquatics Championships was held on 19 August 2022.

== Results ==
The preliminary round was started at 10:00. The final was held at 16:45.

Green denotes finalists

Rank	Diver	Nationality	Preliminary		Final	
Rank	Diver	Nationality	Points	Rank	Points	Rank
1st place, gold medalist(s)	Chiara Pellacani	Italy	294.50	1	318.75	1
2nd place, silver medalist(s)	Michelle Heimberg	Switzerland	294.40	2	301.80	2
3rd place, bronze medalist(s)	Yasmin Harper	Great Britain	273.25	4	296.20	3
4	Tina Punzel	Germany	260.10	7	277.65	4
5	Clare Cryan	Ireland	261.40	6	268.35	5
6	Emilia Nilsson	Sweden	281.90	3	266.25	6
7	Lauren Hallaselkä	Finland	255.35	8	265.70	7
8	Grace Reid	Great Britain	253.15	9	259.80	8
9	Viktoriya Kesar	Ukraine	251.75	10	256.55	9
10	Elisa Pizzini	Italy	262.80	5	243.85	10
11	Helle Tuxen	Denmark	235.10	12	243.55	11
12	Lena Hentschel	Germany	249.35	11	233.95	12
13	Estilla Mosena	Hungary	232.75	13	did not advance	
14	Daphne Wils	Netherlands	232.10	14	did not advance	
15	Anna Arnautova	Ukraine	230.90	15	did not advance	
16	Madeline Coquoz	Switzerland	229.65	16	did not advance	
17	Kaja Skrzek	Poland	225.60	17	did not advance	
18	Emma Gullstrand	Sweden	210.45	18	did not advance	
19	Rocío Velázquez	Spain	210.15	19	did not advance	
20	Valeria Antolino	Spain	199.05	20	did not advance	
21	Laura Valore	Denmark	191.05	21	did not advance	
22	Aleksandra Błażowska	Poland	186.45		did not advance	
23	Caroline Kupka	Norway	185.45	23	did not advance	
