= Diving at the 2026 European Aquatics Championships – Women's 1 m springboard =

Women's 1 m springboard at the 2026 European Aquatics Championships
- Venue: Paris Aquatic Centre
- Dates: 2 August
- Competitors: 29 from 21 nations
- Winning points: 298.90

Medalists
gold medal	Chiara Pellacani	Italy
silver medal	Michelle Heimberg	Switzerland
bronze medal	Desharne Bent-Ashmeil	Great Britain

The Women's 1 m springboard competition at the 2026 European Aquatics Championships was held on 2 August 2026.

== Results ==
The preliminary round was started at 10:00. The final was started at 21:00.

Green denotes finalists

Rank	Diver	Nationality	Preliminary		Final	
Rank	Diver	Nationality	Points	Rank	Points	Rank
1st place, gold medalist(s)	Chiara Pellacani	Italy	263.35	1	298.90	1
2nd place, silver medalist(s)	Michelle Heimberg	Switzerland	255.35	4	258.80	2
3rd place, bronze medalist(s)	Desharne Bent-Ashmeil	Great Britain	231.15	12	254.35	3
4	Uliana Kliueva	Neutral Athletes B	245.90	6	251.20	4
5	Elisa Pizzini	Italy	234.65	10	245.30	5
6	Elna Widerström	Sweden	247.40	5	242.35	6
7	Yelyzaveta Diadiuk	Ukraine	245.00	7	238.10	7
8	Aleksandra Bibikina	Armenia	239.80	9	236.00	8
9	Diana Karnafel	Ukraine	233.10	11	229.50	9
10	Lena Hentschel	Germany	255.40	3	227.95	10
11	Kristina Aidarova	Neutral Athletes B	255.95	2	223.70	11
12	Naïs Gillet	France	241.80	8	201.90	12
13	Andrea Spendolini-Sirieix	Great Britain	228.05	13	Did not advance	
14	Kaja Skrzek	Poland	227.55	14	Did not advance	
15	Hanna Ekdahl	Sweden	221.70	15	Did not advance	
16	Amélie Bayol	France	221.50	16	Did not advance	
17	Manou Meulebeek	Netherlands	218.35	17	Did not advance	
18	Amelie Foerster	Romania	215.75	18	Did not advance	
19	Tereza Jelínková	Czechia	213.05	19	Did not advance	
20	Aliaksandra Puz	Neutral Athletes A	210.55	20	Did not advance	
21	Oona Abbema	Netherlands	208.75	21	Did not advance	
22	Aryna Papova	Neutral Athletes A	198.65	22	Did not advance	
23	Caroline Kupka	Norway	198.55	23	Did not advance	
24	Odessa Käck	Finland	198.05	24	Did not advance	
25	Iva Ereminova	Bulgaria	190.45	25	Did not advance	
26	Ece Şevval Erzincan	Turkey	180.85	26	Did not advance	
27	Laura Valore	Denmark	173.80	27	Did not advance	
28	Patrícia Kun	Hungary	168.90	28	Did not advance	
29	Tekle Sharia	Georgia	168.05	29	Did not advance	
	Belissima Aydın	Turkey	Did not start			
