= 2024 World Aquatics Junior Diving Championships =

- Host city: Rio de Janeiro, Brazil
- Date: November 24 – December 1, 2024
- Nations: 42
- Athletes: 209
- Events: 17

The 2024 World Aquatics Junior Diving Championships were held in Rio de Janeiro in Brazil from 24 November to 1 December 2024.

== Participating nations ==
Divers from 42 countries participated at the championships.

- Australia
- Austria
- Brazil
- Bulgaria
- Canada
- China
- Chinese Taipei
- Colombia
- Croatia
- Cuba
- Czech Republic
- Ecuador
- France
- Germany
- Georgia
- Great Britain
- Hong Kong
- Hungary
- Iran
- Italy
- Japan
- Kazakhstan
- Kyrgyzstan
- Lithuania
- Malaysia
- Mexico
- Monaco
- New Zealand
- Norway
- Peru
- Poland
- Portugal
- Puerto Rico
- Romania
- South Africa
- Serbia
- Spain
- Sri Lanka
- Sweden
- Switzerland
- Ukraine
- United States

== Medal table ==
Medal table by country:

* Host nation (Brazil)

Rank	Nation	Gold	Silver	Bronze	Total
1	Mexico	4	4	0	8
2	China	4	1	1	6
3	Ukraine	2	2	5	9
4	United States	2	2	1	5
5	Italy	2	2	0	4
6	Germany	2	1	4	7
7	Australia	1	2	0	3
8	Colombia	0	1	1	2
8	Great Britain	0	1	1	2
10	Norway	0	1	0	1
11	Canada	0	0	1	1
11	Croatia	0	0	1	1
11	Czech Republic	0	0	1	1
11	Malaysia	0	0	1	1
Totals (14 entries)		17	17	17	51

== Medal summary ==
=== Men's events ===
Event	Gold		Silver		Bronze	
Age Group A
1m springboard A	Josh Sollenberger; United States	503.55	Miguel Tovar; Colombia	494.55	Max Otto; Germany	467.55
3m springboard A	Yan Xin; China	546.60	Isak Børslien; Norway	508.35	Nurqayyum Nazmi bin Mohamad Nazim; Malaysia	506.75
Platform A	Simone Conte; Italy	547.65	Danylo Avanesov; Ukraine	531.70	Joshua Hedberg; United States	528.70
Age Group B
1m springboard B	Finn Awe; Germany	425.55	Louis Aaron Forster; Germany	414.60	Valerii Malieiev; Ukraine	407.25
3m springboard B	Finn Awe; Germany	474.15	Valerii Malieiev; Ukraine	470.10	Dmytro Stepanov; Ukraine	441.25
10m platform B	Mark Hrytsenko; Ukraine	424.35	Mateo Zacai Nolasco Zenteno; Mexico	404.15	Claude-Olivier Lisé-Coderre; Canada	402.20

=== Women's events ===
Event	Gold		Silver		Bronze	
Age Group A
1m springboard A	Long Yiping; China	404.45	Lanie Gutch; United States	385.30	Liu Jiadan; China	355.90
3m springboard A	Long Yiping; China	464.90	Liu Jiadan; China	406.70	Tereza Jelínková; Czech Republic	397.90
10m platform A	Xu Nan; China	465.75	Maisie Bond; Great Britain	439.80	Mariana Osorio; Colombia	400.80
Age Group B
1m springboard B	Rut Elisa Páez Manjarrez; Mexico	338.00	Kayla Jensen; United States	321.80	Kseniia Bochek; Ukraine	319.40
3m springboard B	Rut Elisa Páez Manjarrez; Mexico	380.20	Zyanya Yunuen Parra Martin; Mexico	375.00	Nina Philine Berger; Germany	359.35
10m platform B	Maggie Grey; Australia	375.70	Rut Elisa Páez Manjarrez; Mexico	343.00	Diana Shevchenko; Ukraine	330.60

=== Synchronized diving ===
Event	Gold		Silver		Bronze	
Men's events
3m springboard A/B	Mexico; Jesus Miguel Agundez Mora; David Gabriel Vázquez Cio	287.07	Italy; Simone Conte; Valerio Mosca	283.86	Croatia; Matej Nevešćanin; Luka Martinović	281.55
10m platform A/B	Italy; Raffaele Pelligra; Simone Conte	301.71	Mexico; Emilio Treviño Laureano; Alejandro Flores Jiménez	295.32	Germany; Ole Johannes Rösler; Iven Prenzyna	294.00
Women's events
3m springboard A/B	Ukraine; Kseniia Bochek; Diana Karnafel	278.58	Italy; Rebecca Ciancaglini; Giorgia De Sanctis	264.78	Germany; Zoe Marie Schneider; Aliana Reihs	264.48
10m platform A/B	Mexico; Abigail Gonzalez Roel; Rut Elisa Páez Manjarrez	276.30	Australia; Ellie Cole; Ruby Drogemuller	275.76	Great Britain; Hannah Newbrook; Maisie Bond	275.16
Mixed events
Team event	United States; Kayla Jensen; Joshua Hedberg; Josh Sollenberger; Anna Lemkin	361.50	Australia; Jonah Mercieca; Benjamin Wilson; Maggie Grey; Lucy Dovison	338.00	Ukraine; Sofiia Vystakina; Kseniia Bochek; Mark Hrytsenko; Kyrylo Azarov	329.40
