= Diving at the 2026 European Aquatics Championships – Mixed 3 m springboard synchro =

Mixed 3 m springboard synchro at the 2026 European Aquatics Championships
- Venue: Paris Aquatic Centre
- Dates: 2 August
- Competitors: 22 from 11 nations
- Teams: 11
- Winning points: 305.85

Medalists
gold medal	Matteo Santoro; Chiara Pellacani	Italy
silver medal	Ilia Molchanov; Elizaveta Kuzina	Authorised Neutral Athletes
bronze medal	Luis Avila Sanchez; Lena Hentschel	Germany

The Mixed 3 m springboard synchro competition at the 2026 European Aquatics Championships was held on 2 August 2026.

== Results ==
The final was started at 19:00.

Rank	Nation	Points					
Rank	Nation	D1	D2	D3	D4	D5	Total
1st place, gold medalist(s)	Italy; Matteo Santoro; Chiara Pellacani	49.20	47.40	69.30	69.75	70.20	305.85
2nd place, silver medalist(s)	Neutral Athletes B Ilia Molchanov; Elizaveta Kuzina	47.40	46.80	64.80	64.17	63.00	286.17
3rd place, bronze medalist(s)	Germany; Luis Avila Sanchez; Lena Hentschel	46.80	35.40	67.50	66.60	67.89	284.19
4	Ukraine; Kyrylo Azarov; Diana Karnafel	45.00	43.20	54.90	65.70	64.80	273.60
5	Switzerland; Erik Passerone; Michelle Heimberg	45.00	43.20	63.90	51.30	60.45	263.85
6	France; Gwendal Bisch; Naïs Gillet	48.00	37.80	50.40	59.40	56.73	252.33
7	Romania; Alexandru Avasiloae; Amelie Foerster	41.40	42.00	54.27	57.60	55.80	251.07
8	Poland; Kacper Lesiak; Aleksandra Błażowska	44.40	43.20	52.20	54.87	52.20	246.87
9	Netherlands; Matthew Hibbert; Oona Abbema	42.00	36.00	54.00	50.22	58.50	240.72
10	Sweden; Peder Saur Hubred; Hanna Ekdahl	36.60	40.80	48.72	50.40	59.40	235.92
11	Georgia; Koka Sakandelidze; Tekle Sharia	38.40	36.00	49.41	49.50	33.60	206.91
