= Diving at the 2026 European Aquatics Championships – Team =

Team at the 2026 European Aquatics Championships
- Venue: Paris Aquatic Centre
- Dates: 31 July
- Competitors: 36 from 9 nations
- Teams: 9
- Winning points: 410.60

Medalists
gold medal	Chiara Pellacani; Matteo Santoro; Sarah Jodoin Di Maria; Raffaele Pelligra	Italy
silver medal	Nadezhda Trifonova; Grigorii Ivanov; Ekaterina Beliaeva; Ruslan Ternovoi	Authorised Neutral Athletes
bronze medal	Kseniia Bochek; Kirill Boliukh; Oleksiy Sereda; Kseniya Baylo	Ukraine

The Team competition at the 2026 European Aquatics Championships was held on 31 July 2026.

== Results ==
The final was held at 14:30.

Rank	Nation	Points						
Rank	Nation	D1	D2	D3	D4	D5	D6	Total
1st place, gold medalist(s)	Italy; Chiara Pellacani; Matteo Santoro; Sarah Jodoin Di Maria; Raffaele Pelligra	69.75	63.00	66.00	72.00	74.25	65.60	410.60
2nd place, silver medalist(s)	Neutral Athletes B Nadezhda Trifonova; Grigorii Ivanov; Ekaterina Beliaeva; Ruslan Ternovoi	63.00	89.30	51.00	59.20	56.10	67.20	385.80
3rd place, bronze medalist(s)	Ukraine; Kseniia Bochek; Kirill Boliukh; Oleksiy Sereda; Kseniya Baylo	37.50	47.50	63.00	67.20	81.00	72.00	368.20
4	Poland; Kaja Skrzek; Andrzej Rzeszutek; Maria Łukaszewicz; Maciej Bujak	40.60	68.25	65.10	36.40	82.50	75.20	368.05
5	Spain; Valeria Antolino; Juan Cortés; Jorge Rodríguez; Ana Carvajal	45.00	68.40	55.50	59.20	51.00	67.20	346.30
6	France; Juliette Landi; Jules Bouyer; Emily Hallifax; Charles Jouys	48.60	72.20	50.40	57.60	60.80	49.00	338.60
7	Germany; Lena Hentschel; Moritz Wesemann; Pauline Pfeif; Jaden Eikermann	37.50	56.55	69.75	68.80	30.60	56.00	319.20
8	Netherlands; Oona Abbema; Matthew Hibbert; Else Praasterink; Lars van Hilten	42.00	51.15	49.50	64.35	52.80	51.80	311.60
9	Armenia; Aleksandra Bibikina; Marat Grigoryan; Alisa Zakaryan; Arman Enokyan	60.00	0.00	52.65	11.60	49.60	39.15	213.00
	Bulgaria; Iva Ereminova; Tsvetomir Ereminov	Did not start						
