= 2021 FINA World Junior Diving Championships =

International diving competition

- Host city: Kyiv, Ukraine
- Date: December 2–9, 2021
- Venue: Liko Sport Centre
- Nations: 23
- Website: FINA event page

The 2021 FINA World Junior Diving Championships took place in Kyiv, Ukraine, from 2 to 9 December 2021.

== Medal summary ==
=== Men's events ===
Event	Gold		Silver		Bronze	
Age Group A
1m springboard A	Jules Bouyer; France	502.10	Moritz Wesemann; Germany	481.45	Kawan Pereira; Brazil	477.15
3m springboard A	Kawan Pereira; Brazil Danylo Konovalov; Ukraine	532.60	none awarded		Leonardo García; Colombia	521.95
Platform A	Maksim Malofeev; Russia	529.00	Leonardo García; Colombia	503.65	Kawan Pereira; Brazil	476.20
Age Group B
1m springboard B	Jonathan Gisbert Schauer; Germany	416.70	Tomás Tamayo; Colombia	413.15	Matej Nevešćanin; Croatia	403.05
3m springboard B	Matteo Santoro; Italy	493.30	Oleksiy Sereda; Ukraine	491.75	Matteo Cafiero; Italy	468.10
10m platform B	Oleksiy Sereda; Ukraine	484.60	Maxim Gulidov; Russia	427.55	Jaden Eikermann Gregorchuk; Germany	408.70

=== Women's events ===
Event	Gold		Silver		Bronze	
Age Group A
1m springboard A	Jette Müller; Germany	392.35	Uliana Kliueva; Russia	390.05	Emilia Nilsson Garip; Sweden	389.45
3m springboard A	Jette Müller; Germany	438.90	Elizaveta Kuzina; Russia	437.30	Chiara Pellacani; Italy	425.00
10m platform A	Ekaterina Beliaeva; Russia	406.65	Pauline Pfeif; Germany	381.70	Elizaveta Kanso; Russia	370.30
Age Group B
1m springboard B	Johanna Krauss; Germany	341.95	Elisa Pizzini; Italy	339.20	Kseniia Bailo; Ukraine	332.35
3m springboard B	Kseniia Bailo; Ukraine	390.15	Johanna Krauss; Germany	367.00	Elisa Pizzini; Italy	341.25
10m platform B	Kseniia Bailo; Ukraine	328.35	Uliana Manaenkova; Russia	321.75	Ana Carvajal; Spain	297.60

=== Synchronized diving ===
Event	Gold		Silver		Bronze	
Men's events
3m springboard A/B	Espen Prenzyna; Jonathan Gisbert Schauer; Germany	282.81	Bohdan Chyzhovskyi; Danylo Konovalov; Ukraine	282.36	Joung Dong-min; Kim Yeong-ho; South Korea	278.31
10m platform A/B	Danylo Avanesov; Oleksiy Sereda; Ukraine	321.30	Maksim Malofeev; Sandro Rogava; Russia	303.18	Diogo Silva; Kawan Pereira; Brazil	298.47
Women's events
3m springboard A/B	Uliana Kliueva; Elizaveta Kuzina; Russia	283.50	Anna Arnautova; Kseniia Bailo; Ukraine	267.60	Rebecca Curti; Elisa Pizzini; Italy	257.40
10m platform A/B	Ekaterina Beliaeva; Anna Konanykhina; Russia	283.86	Tiffany Brawn; Mariana Osorio; Colombia	226.05	Maia Biginelli; Elettra Neroni; Italy	224.10
Mixed events
Team event	Italy; Chiara Pellacani; Riccardo Giovannini; Matteo Santoro	309.95	Russia; Uliana Kliueva; Aleksandr Cherepakhin; Sergei Trifonov; Maksim Malofeev	309.60	Sweden; Elias Petersen; Emilia Nilsson Garip; David Ekdahl; Lovisa Gustavsson	293.50

== Medal table ==
* Host nation (Ukraine)

Rank	Nation	Gold	Silver	Bronze	Total
1	Germany	5	3	1	9
1	Ukraine*	5	3	1	9
3	Russia	4	6	1	11
4	Italy	2	1	5	8
5	Brazil	1	0	3	4
6	France	1	0	0	1
7	Colombia	0	3	1	4
8	Sweden	0	0	2	2
9	Croatia	0	0	1	1
9	South Korea	0	0	1	1
9	Spain	0	0	1	1
Totals (11 entries)		18	16	17	51

== Participating nations ==
Divers from 23 countries participated at the championships.

- Austria
- Belarus
- Brazil
- Colombia
- Croatia
- Czech Republic
- Egypt
- Finland
- France
- Germany
- Greece
- Hungary
- Italy
- Lithuania
- Norway
- Romania
- Russia
- Spain
- South Korea
- Sweden
- Switzerland
- Turkey
- Ukraine
