= Diving at the 2026 European Aquatics Championships – Men's 10 m synchro platform =

Men's 10 m synchro platform at the 2026 European Aquatics Championships
- Venue: Paris Aquatic Centre
- Dates: 4 August
- Competitors: 16 from 8 nations
- Teams: 8
- Winning points: 443.82

Medalists
gold medal	Nikita Shleikher; Ruslan Ternovoi
silver medal	Simone Conte; Raffaele Pelligra	Italy
bronze medal	Mark Hrytsenko; Oleksiy Sereda	Ukraine

The Men's 10 m synchro platform competition at the 2026 European Aquatics Championships was held on 4 August 2026.

== Results ==
The final was started at 19:30.

Rank	Nation	Points						
Rank	Nation	D1	D2	D3	D4	D5	D6	Total
1st place, gold medalist(s)	Neutral Athletes B Nikita Shleikher; Ruslan Ternovoi	52.80	50.40	70.38	96.12	88.80	85.32	443.82
2nd place, silver medalist(s)	Italy; Simone Conte; Raffaele Pelligra	48.00	49.80	75.84	80.19	81.60	81.03	416.46
3rd place, bronze medalist(s)	Ukraine; Mark Hrytsenko; Oleksiy Sereda	48.00	45.00	80.64	78.81	69.36	84.24	406.05
4	Great Britain; Ben Cutmore; Euan McCabe	51.60	50.40	75.48	71.28	72.15	76.68	397.59
5	Germany; Luis Avila Sanchez; Jaden Eikermann	50.40	48.60	77.52	56.16	76.59	83.16	392.43
6	Poland; Maciej Bujak; Robert Łukaszewicz	46.80	48.00	76.80	71.28	72.42	74.88	390.18
7	Austria; Anton Knoll; Dariush Lotfi	48.60	38.40	72.96	68.34	71.04	63.00	362.34
8	Neutral Athletes A Alexandr Koloskov; Siarhei Malashonak	44.40	43.20	58.50	40.32	42.57	60.48	289.47
