= Diving at the 2018 European Aquatics Championships – Women's 3 m synchro springboard =

Women's 3 m synchro springboard at the 2018 European Aquatics Championships
- Venue: Royal Commonwealth Pool
- Dates: 12 August
- Competitors: 18 from 9 nations
- Teams: 9
- Winning points: 289.26

Medalists
gold medal	Elena Bertocchi; Chiara Pellacani	Italy
silver medal	Lena Hentschel; Tina Punzel	Germany
bronze medal	Nadezhda Bazhina; Kristina Ilinykh	Russia

The Women's 3 m synchro springboard competition of the 2018 European Aquatics Championships was held on 12 August 2018.

== Results ==
The final was started at 12:30.

Rank.	Nation	Divers	Points					
Rank.	Nation	Divers	T1	T2	T3	T4	T5	Totale
1st place, gold medalist(s)	Italy	Elena Bertocchi; Chiara Pellacani	46.20	47.40	69.30	66.96	59.40	289.26
2nd place, silver medalist(s)	Germany	Lena Hentschel; Tina Punzel	46.80	45.60	63.00	62.10	69.30	286.80
3rd place, bronze medalist(s)	Russia	Nadezhda Bazhina; Kristina Ilinykh	48.00	50.40	60.30	63.00	61.20	282.90
4	Great Britain	Grace Reid; Katherine Torrance	48.60	49.20	68.40	65.10	39.60	270.90
5	Netherlands	Inge Jansen; Celine van Duijn	43.80	43.20	56.70	63.00	63.00	269.70
6	Ukraine	Viktoriya Kesar; Hanna Pysmenska	46.80	40.80	59.40	67.50	54.87	269.37
7	Switzerland	Madeline Coquoz; Jessica Favre	40.20	40.20	48.60	63.00	58.50	250.50
8	Norway	Anne Tuxen; Helle Tuxen	43.80	39.60	55.44	55.44	48.60	242.88
9	Lithuania	Indrė Girdauskaitė; Genevieve Green	43.20	42.60	42.84	51.12	52.65	232.41
