= Diving at the 2020 European Aquatics Championships – Women's 10 m synchro platform =

Women's 10 m synchro platform at the 2020 European Aquatics Championships
- Venue: Danube Arena
- Dates: 14 May 2021
- Competitors: 12 from 6 nations
- Teams: 6
- Winning points: 307.44

Medalists
gold medal	Ekaterina Beliaeva; Yulia Timoshinina	Russia
silver medal	Eden Cheng; Lois Toulson	Great Britain
bronze medal	Kseniia Bailo; Sofiya Lyskun	Ukraine

The Women's 10 m synchro platform competition of the 2020 European Aquatics Championships was held on 14 May 2021.

== Results ==
The final was started at 19:30.

Rank	Nation	Divers	Points					
Rank	Nation	Divers	T1	T2	T3	T4	T5	Total
1st place, gold medalist(s)	Russia	Ekaterina Beliaeva; Yulia Timoshinina	47.40	46.80	70.20	70.08	72.96	307.44
2nd place, silver medalist(s)	Great Britain	Eden Cheng; Lois Toulson	46.80	47.40	49.50	72.00	74.88	290.58
3rd place, bronze medalist(s)	Ukraine	Kseniia Bailo; Sofiya Lyskun	52.20	51.00	68.16	69.30	46.08	286.74
4	Germany	Tina Punzel; Christina Wassen	46.20	49.20	57.60	61.20	70.08	284.28
5	Norway	Anne Tuxen; Helle Tuxen	45.00	41.40	58.80	59.16	61.32	265.68
6	Italy	Maia Biginelli; Elettra Neroni	43.20	46.80	55.44	41.40	68.28	252.12
