= 2025 European Diving Championships =

Water sport competitions

- Host city: Antalya
- Country: Turkey
- Events: 13
- Dates: 22–28 May 2025

The 2025 European Diving Championships are held in Antalya, Turkey, from 22 to 28 May 2025. This is the 8th edition of the stand-alone Championships, and the 44nd European Championships in diving in total, including the diving portion of the European Aquatics Championships.

== Medal table ==
* Host nation (Turkey)

After 13 of 13 events.
Rank	Nation	Gold	Silver	Bronze	Total
1	Ukraine (UKR)	5	1	1	7
2	Germany (GER)	3	5	4	12
3	Italy (ITA)	2	4	2	8
4	Switzerland (SUI)	1	0	1	2
5	Poland (POL)	1	0	0	1
5	Spain (ESP)	1	0	0	1
7	Great Britain (GBR)	0	1	3	4
8	Armenia (ARM)	0	1	0	1
8	Sweden (SWE)	0	1	0	1
10	Austria (AUT)	0	0	1	1
10	Netherlands (NED)	0	0	1	1
Totals (11 entries)		13	13	13	39

== Medalists ==
=== Men ===
Event	Gold		Silver		Bronze	
1 m springboard	Moritz Wesemann; Germany	400.60	Lorenzo Marsaglia; Italy	391.75	Danylo Konovalov; Ukraine	390.55
3 m springboard	Andrzej Rzeszutek; Poland	431.25	Noah Penman; Great Britain	429.70	Moritz Wesemann; Germany	426.85
10 m platform	Oleksiy Sereda; Ukraine	468.35	Ole Rösler; Germany	439.45	Anton Knoll; Austria	423.35
3 m synchro springboard	Germany; Timo Barthel; Moritz Wesemann	389.58	Italy; Lorenzo Marsaglia; Giovanni Tocci	386.70	Great Britain; Leon Baker; Hugo Thomas	383.25
10 m synchro platform	Ukraine; Mark Hrytsenko; Oleksiy Sereda	413.76	Germany; Espen Prenzyna; Ole Rösler	402.24	Italy; Simone Conte; Ricardo Giovannini	378.45

=== Women ===
Event	Gold		Silver		Bronze	
1 m springboard	Chiara Pellacani; Italy	283.75	Elna Widerström; Sweden	267.10	Michelle Heimberg; Switzerland	265.90
3 m springboard	Michelle Heimberg; Switzerland	335.10	Alexandra Bibikina; Armenia	322.95	Lena Hentschel; Germany	312.70
10 m platform	Sarah Jodoin Di Maria; Italy	324.85	Pauline Pfeif; Germany	319.45	Else Praasterink; Netherlands	312.10
3 m synchro springboard	Ukraine; Kseniia Bochek; Diana Karnafel	276.84	Germany; Lena Hentschel; Jette Müller	265.95	Great Britain; Desharne Bent-Ashmeil; Amy Rollinson	264.90
10 m synchro platform	Spain; Valeria Antolino; Ana Carvajal	305.82	Ukraine; Kseniya Baylo; Sofiya Lyskun	286.44	Germany; Carolina Coordes; Pauline Pfeif	278.70

=== Mixed ===
Event	Gold		Silver		Bronze	
3 m synchro springboard	Germany; Luis Avila Sanchez; Lena Hentschel	289.74	Italy; Matteo Santoro; Chiara Pellacani	289.71	Great Britain; Ben Cutmore; Desharne Bent-Ashmeil	271.80
10 m synchro platform	Ukraine; Kseniya Baylo; Kirill Boliukh	308.34	Italy; Riccardo Giovannini; Sarah Jodoin Di Maria	298.74	Germany; Luis Avila Sanchez; Pauline Pfeif	297.00
Team event	Ukraine; Kseniya Baylo; Sofiya Lyskun; Kirill Boliukh; Oleksiy Sereda	407.20	Germany; Lena Hentschel; Pauline Pfeif; Ole Rösler; Moritz Wesemann	400.60	Italy; Sarah Jodoin Di Maria; Chiara Pellacani; Riccardo Giovannini; Matteo Santoro	360.40
