= Diving at the 2022 European Aquatics Championships – Women's 3 m synchro springboard =

Women's 3 m synchro springboard at the 2022 European Aquatics Championships
- Venue: Foro Italico
- Dates: 18 August
- Competitors: 16 from 8 nations
- Winning points: 281.16

Medalists
| gold medal | Lena Hentschel; Tina Punzel | Germany |
| silver medal | Elena Bertocchi; Chiara Pellacani | Italy |
| bronze medal | Emilia Nilsson; Elna Widerström | Sweden |

The Women's 3 m synchro springboard competition of the 2022 European Aquatics Championships was held on 18 August 2022.

== Results ==
The final was started at 15:30.

| Rank | Nation | Divers | Points | | | | | |
| Rank | Nation | Divers | T1 | T2 | T3 | T4 | T5 | Total |
|---|---|---|---|---|---|---|---|---|
| 1st place, gold medalist(s) | Germany | Lena Hentschel; Tina Punzel | 47.40 | 46.20 | 60.30 | 60.30 | 66.96 | 281.16 |
| 2nd place, silver medalist(s) | Italy | Elena Bertocchi; Chiara Pellacani | 46.20 | 34.20 | 61.20 | 66.96 | 52.20 | 260.76 |
| 3rd place, bronze medalist(s) | Sweden | Emilia Nilsson; Elna Widerström | 46.20 | 45.00 | 52.20 | 56.70 | 57.60 | 257.70 |
| 4 | Great Britain | Desharne Bent-Ashmeil; Amy Rollinson | 40.80 | 43.80 | 53.10 | 60.30 | 59.40 | 257.40 |
| 5 | Ukraine | Viktoriya Kesar; Hanna Pysmenska | 46.80 | 40.80 | 54.90 | 49.29 | 54.00 | 245.79 |
| 6 | France | Jade Gillet; Naïs Gillet | 42.60 | 40.80 | 55.08 | 46.20 | 45.36 | 230.04 |
| 7 | Switzerland | Madeline Coquoz; Morgane Herculano | 40.80 | 41.40 | 47.04 | 46.20 | 44.55 | 219.99 |
| 8 | Hungary | Eszter Kovács; Estilla Mosena | 37.80 | 37.80 | 44.64 | 49.21 | 46.20 | 215.85 |
