= Kawan Pereira =

Brazilian diver

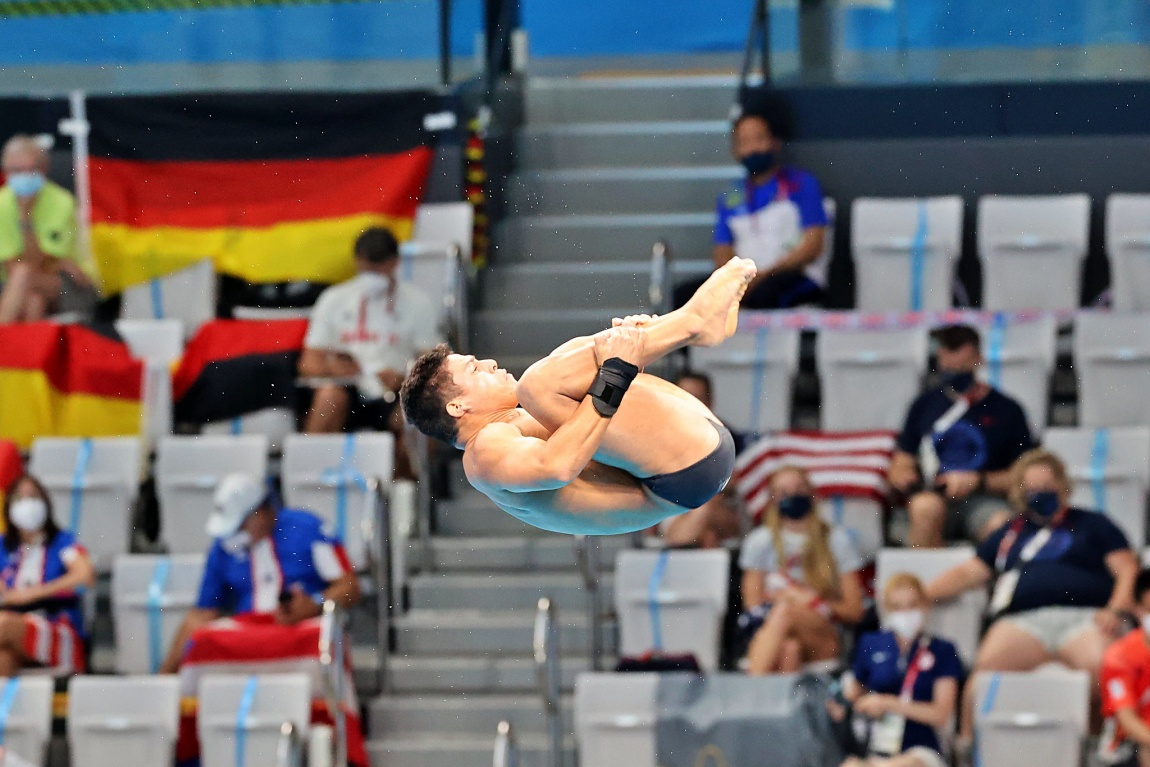
- Pereira in 2021

Personal information
- Born: 17 June 2002 (age 24) Parnaíba, Brazil

Sport
- Sport: Diving
Medal record
Men's diving
Representing Brazil
Pan American Games
Bronze medal – third place	2019 Lima	10 m synchro
FINA World Junior Diving Championships
Gold medal – first place	2021 Kyiv	3 m springboard
Bronze medal – third place	2021 Kyiv	1 m springboard
Bronze medal – third place	2021 Kyiv	10 m platform
Bronze medal – third place	2021 Kyiv	10 m synchro
Junior Pan American Games
Bronze medal – third place	2021 Cali	10 m platform

Kawan Figueiredo Pereira (born 17 June 2002) is a Brazilian diver. He competed in the 2020 Summer Olympics for Brazil.

At the 2019 Pan American Games, he won a bronze medal in the Men's synchronized 10 metre platform.

At just 19 years of age, he made history at the 2020 Olympic Games in Tokyo, being the first Brazilian to reach an Olympic final in diving, finishing in 10th place.

As part of the FINA open water mixed 3 metre springboard and 10 metre platform diving event, held as part of a diving exhibition at the Abu Dhabi Aquatics Festival in December 2021 in Abu Dhabi, United Arab Emirates, Pereira helped win the gold medal with a score of 416.35 points alongside teammates Luana Lira and Ingrid Oliveira.
