= Sarah Jodoin Di Maria =

Canadian-Italian diver (born 2000)

Personal information
- Nationality: Italian
- Born: 3 January 2000 (age 26) Montreal, Canada

Sport
- Country: Italy
- Sport: Diving
- Event: 10 m
Medal record
Women's diving
Representing Italy
European Games
Silver medal – second place	2023 Kraków-Małopolska	Team
Bronze medal – third place	2023 Kraków-Małopolska	10 m platform
Bronze medal – third place	2023 Kraków-Małopolska	10 m mixed synchro
European Championships
Gold medal – first place	2022 Rome	Team event
Gold medal – first place	2026 Paris	Team event
Silver medal – second place	2020 Budapest	Team event
Bronze medal – third place	2022 Rome	10 m mixed synchro
European Diving Championships
Gold medal – first place	2025 Antalya	10 m platform
Silver medal – second place	2023 Rzeszów	Team
Silver medal – second place	2025 Antalya	10 m mixed synchro
Bronze medal – third place	2023 Rzeszów	10 m platform
Bronze medal – third place	2023 Rzeszów	10 m mixed synchro
Bronze medal – third place	2025 Antalya	Team

Sarah Jodoin Di Maria (born 3 January 2000 in Montreal, Quebec) is a Canadian-born Italian diver, a 2020 European silver medallist in the team event.

== Career ==
Jodoin Di Maria was born in Quebec and is of Italian descent through her father. She was a competitive skier, gymnast and diver in her youth, before focusing exclusively on diving at the age of 16. In 2017, the Canadian gymnastics team did not call her up to a training camp, so Jodoin Di Maria contacted the coach of the Italian team and former Olympic diver Domenico Rinaldi. She opted to represent Italy after a camp there, and moved there in 2018 after getting her citizenship. As of 2021, she resides in Rome. She represented Italy at the 2020 Summer Olympic Games in Tokyo.
