= Grigory Ivanov (diver) =

Russian diver (born 2001)

Personal information
- Born: 13 March 2001 (age 25) Chelyabinsk, Russia

Sport
- Country: Russia
- Sport: Diving
Medal record
Men's diving
Representing Neutral Athletes B
European Championships
Silver medal – second place	2026 Paris	Team

Grigory Sergeyevich Ivanov (Russian: Григорий Сергеевич Иванов; alt. sp.: Grigorii Ivanov; born 13 March 2001) is a Russian diver.

== Early life ==
Ivanov was born in Chelyabinsk.

== Career ==
He is part of the Neutral Athletes B team that won the silver medals in the team event at the 2026 European Aquatics Championships.
