= Luis Avila Sanchez =

German diver (born 2003)

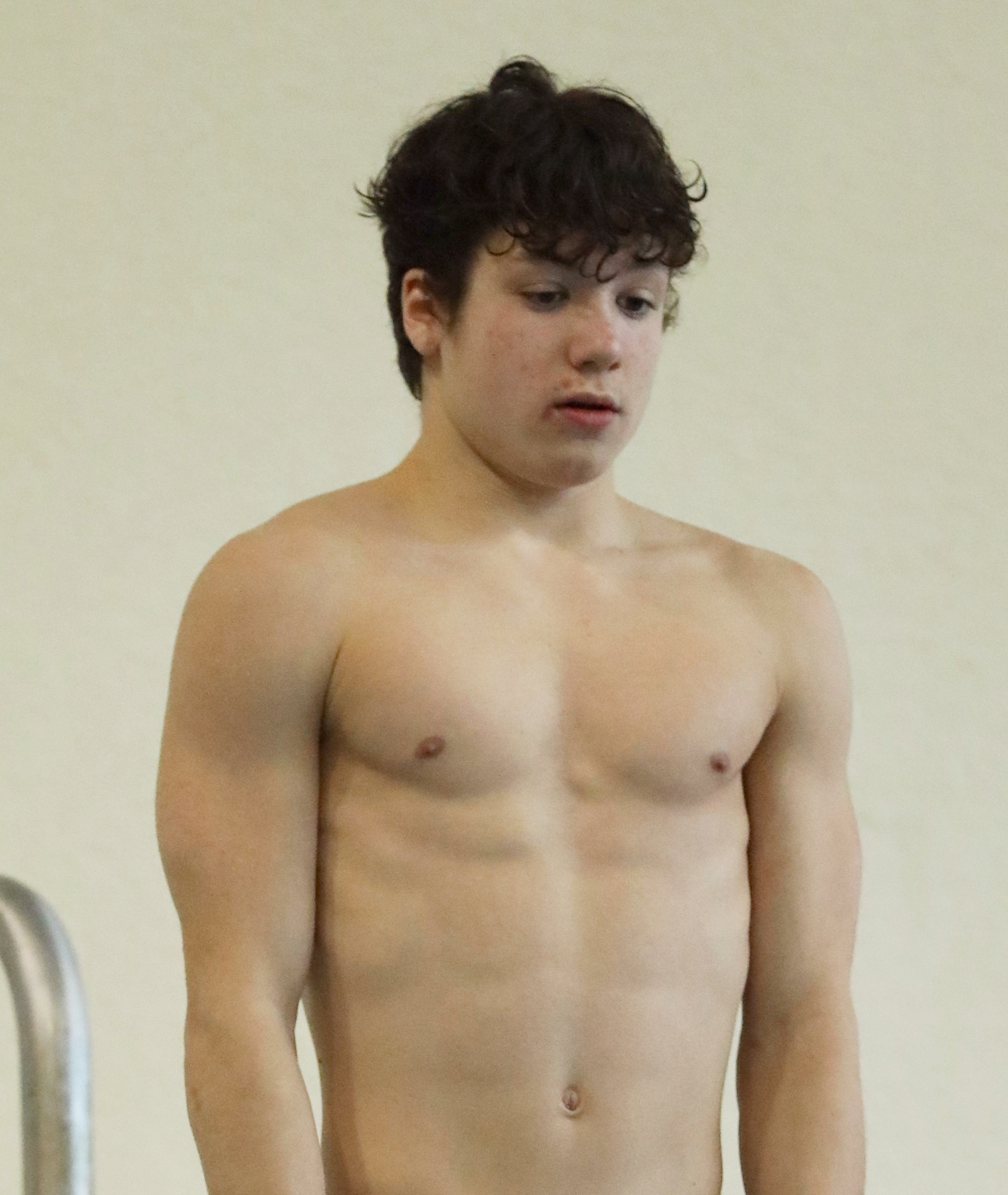

Personal information
- Born: 15 August 2005 (age 20)

Sport
- Country: Germany
- Sport: Diving
Medal record
Men's diving
Representing Germany
European Championships
Bronze medal – third place	2024 Belgrade	Team
Bronze medal – third place	2026 Paris	Mixed 3 m synchro
European Diving Championships
Gold medal – first place	2025 Antalya	Mixed 3 m synchro
Bronze medal – third place	2025 Antalya	Mixed 10 m synchro
World University Games
Gold medal – first place	2025 Rhine-Ruhr	Mixed 3 m synchro
Silver medal – second place	2025 Rhine-Ruhr	10 m synchro

Luis Carlo Avila Sanchez (Spanish: Luis Carlo Ávila Sánchez; born 15 August 2005) is a German diver.

== Career ==
At the 2026 European Aquatics Championships, he won the bronze medal in the mixed 3 m springboard synchro event, pairing with Lena Hentschel.
