= Diving at the 2024 European Aquatics Championships – Mixed 10 m platform synchro =

European aquatics competition

Mixed 10 m platform synchro at the 2024 European Aquatics Championships
- Venue: Serbian Institute For Sports And Sports Medicine
- Dates: 18 June
- Competitors: 8 from 4 nations
- Teams: 4
- Winning points: 274.50

Medalists
gold medal	Carlos Camacho del Hoyo; Valeria Antolino	Spain
silver medal	Tom Waldsteiner; Carolina Coordes	Germany
bronze medal	Marko Barsukov; Kseniia Bailo	Ukraine

The Mixed 10 m platform synchro competition of the 2024 European Aquatics Championships was held on 18 June 2024.

== Results ==
The final started at 15:30.

(F) Female; (M) Male;

Rank	Nation	Divers	Points					
Rank	Nation	Divers	T1	T2	T3	T4	T5	Total
1st place, gold medalist(s)	Spain	Carlos Camacho del Hoyo (M); Valeria Antolino (F)	47.40	46.20	65.70	53.76	61.44	274.50
2nd place, silver medalist(s)	Germany	Tom Waldsteiner (M); Carolina Coordes (F)	46.80	44.40	58.56	51.30	65.28	266.34
3rd place, bronze medalist(s)	Ukraine	Marko Barsukov (M); Kseniia Bailo (F)	48.00	43.80	47.88	61.44	54.90	256.02
4	Romania	Alexandru Avasiloae (M); Amelie-Enya Foerster (F)	39.60	38.40	29.76	52.08	47.04	206.88
