= Simone Conte =

Italian diver (born 2007)

Personal information
- Nationality: Italian
- Born: 25 July 2007 (age 19)

Sport
- Country: Italy
- Sport: Diving
Medal record
Men's diving
Representing Italy
European Championships
Silver medal – second place	2026 Paris	10 m synchro
European Diving Championships
Bronze medal – third place	2025 Antalya	10 m synchro

Simone Conte (born 25 July 2007) is an Italian diver.

== Career ==
Conte competed at the 2024 World Aquatics Junior Diving Championships and won gold medals in the 10 metre platform and 10 metre synchro, and a silver medal in the 3 metre synchro events.

He competed at the 2026 European Aquatics Championships and won a silver medal in the 10 metre synchro event, along with Raffaele Pelligra.
