= Nadezhda Trifonova =

Russian diver (born 2008)

Personal information
- Born: 1 August 2008 (age 18) Saint Petersburg, Russia

Sport
- Country: Russia
- Sport: Diving
Medal record
Women's diving
Representing Neutral Athletes B
European Championships
Silver medal – second place	2026 Paris	Team
Bronze medal – third place	2026 Paris	3 m springboard

Nadezhda Yurievna Trifonova (Russian: Надежда Юрьевна Трифонова; born 1 August 2008) is a Russian diver.

== Early life ==
Trifonova was born in Saint Petersburg.

== Career ==
In June 2026, she competed at the European Junior Diving Championships and won the silver in the mixed team event and the gold in the girls' 1m springboard event.

She is part of the Neutral Athletes B team that won the silver medals in the team event at the 2026 European Aquatics Championships. She will also compete in the 3m springboard event.
