= Bohdan Chyzhovskyi =

Ukrainian diver (born 2003)

Personal information
- Native name: Богдан Чижовський
- Born: 1 September 2003 (age 22) Mykolaiv, Ukraine

Sport
- Country: Ukraine
- Sport: Diving
Medal record
Men's diving
Representing Ukraine
Event	1st	2nd	3rd
World Junior Championships	0	1	0
European Junior Championships	1	1	0
Total	1	2	0
World Junior Championships
Silver medal – second place	2021 Kyiv	3 m synchro
European Junior Championships
Gold medal – first place	2021 Rijeka	Mixed team event
Silver medal – second place	2018 Helsinki	3 m springboard

Bohdan Chyzhovskyi (Ukrainian: Богдан Чижовський, born 1 September 2003 in Mykolaiv) is a Ukrainian diver.

== Career ==
In 2018, Chyzhovskyi won a silver medal in 3 m springboard event at the 2018 European Junior Diving Championships in Helsinki, Finland.

The following, he competed at the European Junior Diving Championships in Rijeka, where he received a gold medal in mixed team event. The same year, he received a silver medal in the 3 m synchronized springboard event at the 2021 FINA World Junior Diving Championships in Kyiv.
