= Ekaterina Beliaeva =

Russian diver (born 2003)

Personal information
- Full name: Ekaterina Konstantinovna Beliaeva
- Nationality: Russian
- Born: 22 June 2003 (age 23)

Sport
- Country: Russia
- Sport: Diving
- Event: 10 m synchro
Medal record
Women's diving
Representing Neutral Athletes B
European Championships
Silver medal – second place	2026 Paris	Team
Representing Russia
World Championships
Silver medal – second place	2019 Gwangju	10 m mixed synchro
European Championships
Gold medal – first place	2020 Budapest	Team event
Gold medal – first place	2020 Budapest	10 m synchro
Silver medal – second place	2018 Glasgow	10 m synchro
Bronze medal – third place	2020 Budapest	10m mixed synchro
European Diving Championships
Gold medal – first place	2019 Kyiv	10 m mixed synchro
Silver medal – second place	2019 Kyiv	Team event
Bronze medal – third place	2019 Kyiv	10 m synchro

Ekaterina Konstantinovna Beliaeva (Russian: Екатерина Константиновна Беляева; born 22 June 2003) is a Russian diver.

She won a silver medal in the 10 m synchro platform competition at the 2018 European Aquatics Championships.
