= Raffaele Pelligra (diver) =

Ukrainian diver (born 2009)

Personal information
- Born: 4 December 2008 (age 17)

Sport
- Country: Italy
- Sport: Diving
Medal record
Men's diving
Representing Italy
European Championships
Gold medal – first place	2026 Paris	Team
Silver medal – second place	2026 Paris	10 m synchro

Raffaele Pelligra (born 4 December 2008) is an Italian diver.

== Career ==
He is part of the Italian team that won the gold medal in the team event at the 2026 European Championships.
