= Kseniya Baylo =

Ukrainian diver (born 2005)

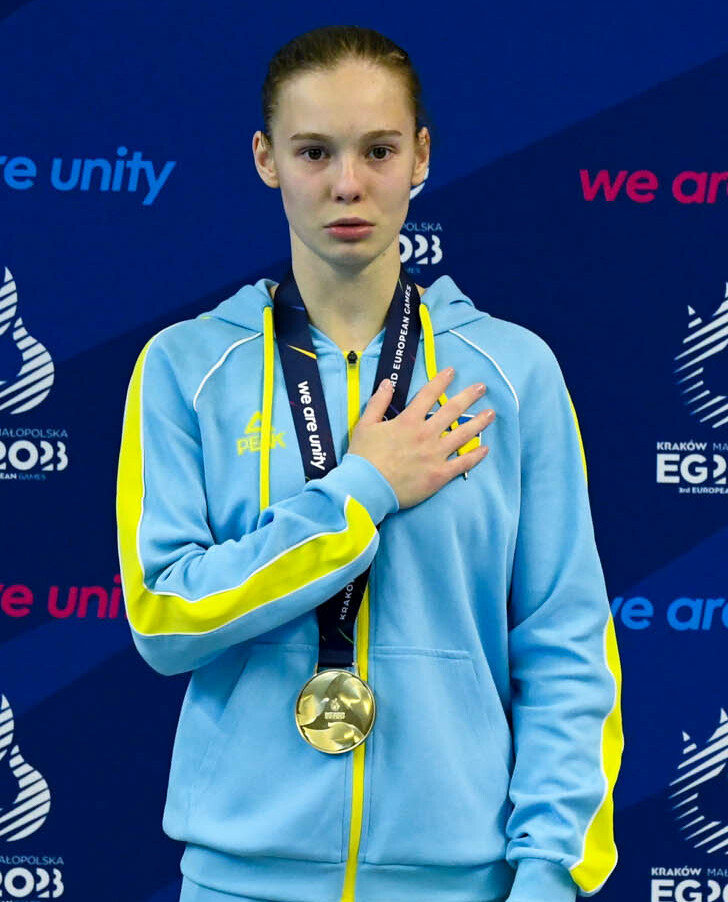
- Baylo at the 2023 European Games

Personal information
- Native name: Ксенія Олегівна Байло
- Full name: Kseniia Olehivna Bailo
- Born: 25 February 2005 (age 21) Mykolaiv, Ukraine

Sport
- Country: Ukraine
- Sport: Diving
Medal record
Women's diving
Representing Ukraine
FINA Diving World Cup
Bronze medal – third place	2024 Xi'an	10 m synchro
European Games
Gold medal – first place	2023 Kraków–Małopolska	10 m mixed synchro
Gold medal – first place	2023 Kraków–Małopolska	Team
Silver medal – second place	2023 Kraków–Małopolska	10 m synchro
European Championships
Gold medal – first place	2020 Budapest	10 m mixed synchro
Gold medal – first place	2024 Belgrade	10 m synchro
Gold medal – first place	2026 Paris	10 m mixed synchro
Silver medal – second place	2022 Rome	Team event
Silver medal – second place	2022 Rome	10 m synchro
Bronze medal – third place	2020 Budapest	10 m synchro
Bronze medal – third place	2024 Belgrade	10 m mixed synchro
Bronze medal – third place	2026 Paris	Team event
Bronze medal – third place	2026 Paris	10 m synchro
European Diving Championships
Gold medal – first place	2023 Rzeszów	10 m mixed synchro
Gold medal – first place	2023 Rzeszów	Team
Gold medal – first place	2025 Antalya	Mixed team
Gold medal – first place	2025 Antalya	10 m mixed synchro
Silver medal – second place	2023 Rzeszów	10 m synchro
Silver medal – second place	2025 Antalya	10 m synchro
World Junior Championships
Gold medal – first place	2021 Kyiv	10 m platform
Gold medal – first place	2021 Kyiv	3 m springboard
Silver medal – second place	2021 Kyiv	1 m springboard
Silver medal – second place	2021 Kyiv	3 m synchro
European Junior Diving Championships
Gold medal – first place	2021 Rijeka	10 m synchro
Silver medal – second place	2021 Rijeka	10 m platform

Kseniya Olehivna Baylo (Ukrainian: Ксенія Олегівна Байло, born 25 February 2005) is a Ukrainian diver.

== Career ==
In 2021, Baylo and Oleksiy Sereda won the gold medal in the mixed 10 m platform synchro event at the 2020 European Aquatics Championships held in Budapest, Hungary. Baylo and Sofiya Lyskun won the bronze medal in the women's 10 m synchro platform event.

In the 2021 FINA World Junior Diving Championships in her home country Ukraine, she won gold in the 3m springboard and 10m platform event of her age group B.

At the 2026 European Championships, she won the bronze medal in the women's 10 m synchro event, pairing with Sofiia Vystavkina.
