= Mark Hrytsenko =

Ukrainian diver (born 2009)

Personal information
- Native name: Марк Олексійович Гриценко
- Citizenship: Ukrainian
- Born: 21 October 2009 (age 17)

Sport
- Country: Ukraine
- Sport: Diving
Medal record
Men's diving
Representing Ukraine
World Cup
Silver medal – second place	2026 Beijing	10 m synchro
European Championships
Bronze medal – third place	2026 Paris	10 m synchro
European Diving Championships
Gold medal – first place	2025 Antalya	10 m synchro

Mark Oleksiiovych Hrytsenko (Ukrainian: Марк Гриценко; born 21 October 2009) is a Ukrainian diver.

== Career ==
Hrytsenko is 2023 European Junior Champion in 3 m trampoline.

Hrytsenko made his Ukrainian senior national team debut in 2024, at the age of 14, when he competed at the 2024 European Aquatics Championships. Together with Kirill Boliukh, he finished 5th in 10 m synchro platform.
