= Elisa Pizzini =

Italian diver (born 2005)

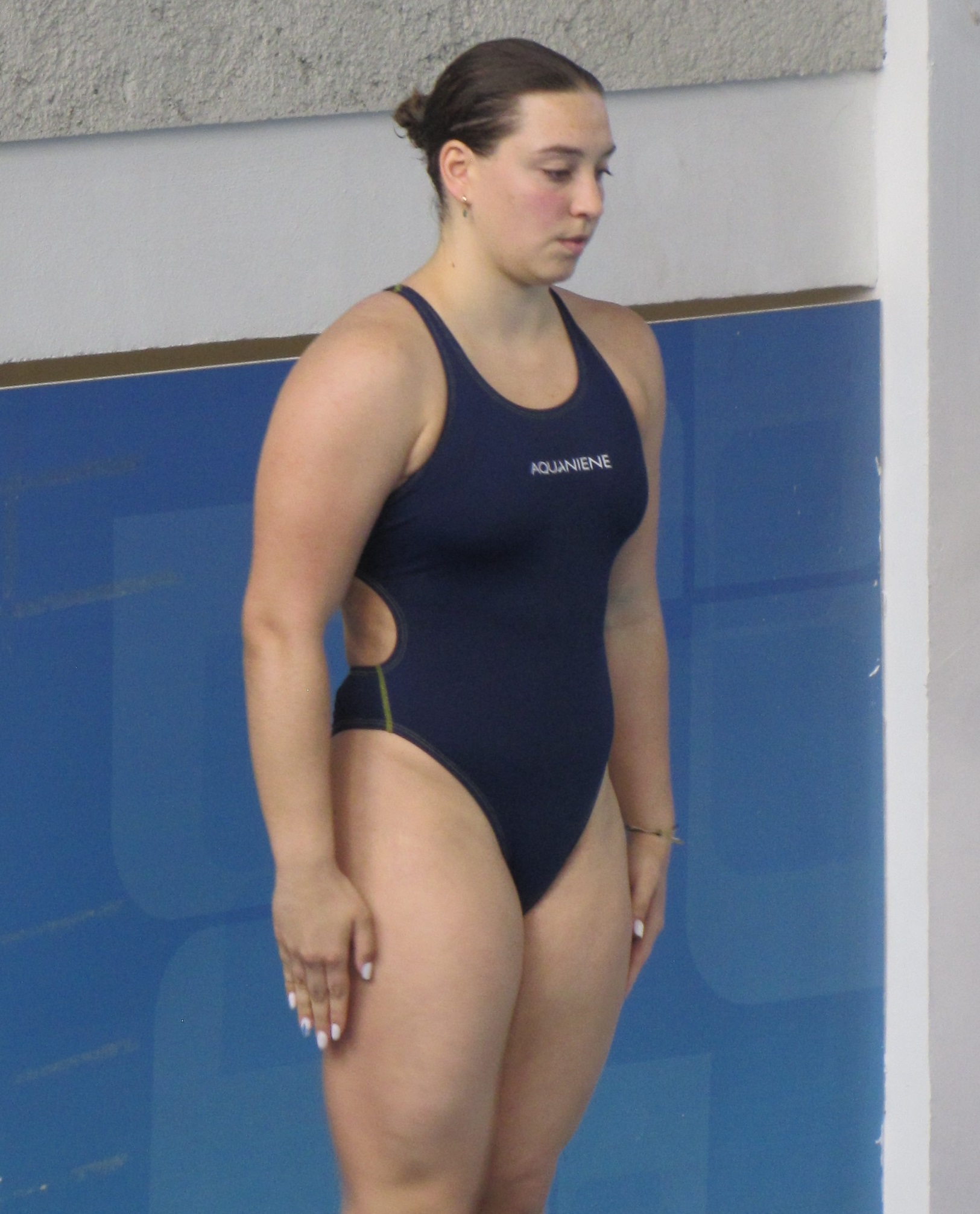
- Pizzini in 2023

Personal information
- Born: 21 January 2005 (age 21) Verona, Italy

Sport
- Country: Italy
- Sport: Diving
Medal record
Women's diving
Representing Italy
European Championships
Gold medal – first place	2026 Paris	3 m synchro
World Junior Championships
Silver medal – second place	2021 Kyiv	1 m springboard
Bronze medal – third place	2021 Kyiv	3 m springboard
Bronze medal – third place	2021 Kyiv	3 m synchro
European Junior Championships
Gold medal – first place	2022 Otopeni	Mixed team
Silver medal – second place	2022 Otopeni	3 m springboard
Bronze medal – third place	2022 Otopeni	1 m springboard

Elisa Pizzini (born 21 January 2005) is an Italian diver.

== Career ==
In August 2026, Pizzini competed at the 2026 European Aquatics Championships and won a gold medal in the 3 metre synchro event, along with Chiara Pellacani, with a score of 308.07 points. She also finished in fourth place in the 3 metre springboard and fifth place in the 1 metre springboard events.
