= Anna Arnautova =

Ukrainian diver (born 2004)

Personal information
- Born: 1 June 2004 (age 22)

Sport
- Country: Ukraine
- Sport: Diving
Medal record
Women's diving
Representing Ukraine
Event	1st	2nd	3rd
World Junior Championships	0	1	0
European Junior Championships	3	1	0
Total	3	2	0
World Junior Championships
Silver medal – second place	2021 Kyiv	3 m synchro
European Junior Championships
Gold medal – first place	2021 Rijeka	Mixed team event
Gold medal – first place	2022 Otopeni	1 m springboard
Gold medal – first place	2022 Otopeni	3 m synchro
Silver medal – second place	2018 Helsinki	1 m springboard

Anna Arnautova (born 1 June 2004) is a Ukrainian diver. She represented Ukraine at the 2019 World Aquatics Championships held in Gwangju, South Korea. She competed in the women's 1 metre springboard and team events.

In 2019, she competed in the women's 1 metre springboard event at the European Diving Championships held in Kyiv, Ukraine. In 2021, she competed at the 2020 European Aquatics Championships held in Budapest, Hungary.
