= Yasmin Harper =

British diver (born 2000)

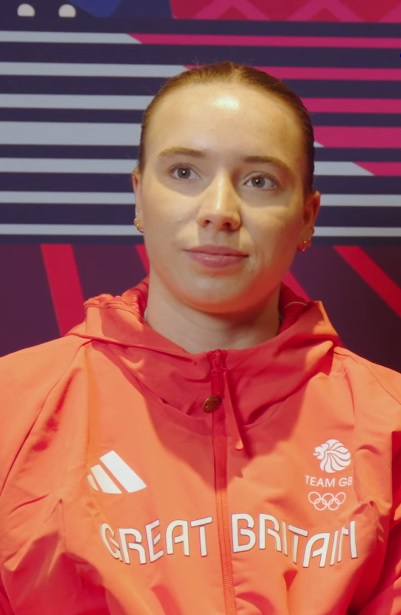
- Harper in 2024

Personal information
- Full name: Yasmin Isis Harper
- Nationality: British; English
- Born: 28 July 2000 (age 26) Chester, Cheshire, England

Sport
- Country: Great Britain
- Sport: Diving
- Club: City of Sheffield
Medal record
Women's diving
Representing Great Britain
Olympic Games
Bronze medal – third place	2024 Paris	3 m synchro
World Championships
Silver medal – second place	2023 Fukuoka	3 m synchro
Silver medal – second place	2025 Singapore	3 m synchro
Bronze medal – third place	2024 Doha	3 m synchro
European Championships
Silver medal – second place	2026 Paris	3 m springboard
Bronze medal – third place	2022 Rome	3 m springboard

Yasmin Isis Harper (born 28 July 2000) is a British diver. She won a bronze medal in the 3m synchro springboard event at the 2024 Summer Olympics.

== Early life ==
Harper grew up in Sheffield, South Yorkshire. She attended High Storrs School.

== Career ==
Harper was a multiple British champion before she represented England at the 2022 Commonwealth Games in the 1m and 3m springboard events.

In May 2023, she dominated at the British Diving Championships, winning her third consecutive 1m springboard title, her second consecutive 3m springboard title and the 3m synchro title with Scarlett Mew Jensen.

In July 2023, she won a silver medal at the 2023 World Aquatics Championships, diving with Mew Jensen again, in the 3m synchro springboard event. This sealed qualification for the Paris 2024 Summer Olympics. She was one of first British athletes at the Olympics to begin her competition on 27 July 2024, and subsequently won the bronze medal with Mew Jensen. This bronze was Great Britain’s first medal in women's diving for 64 years. Later in the Games, Harper finished fifth in the individual three metre springboard.

In 2025, at the World Championships in Singapore, she won a silver medal with Scarlett Mew Jensen, in the 3 metre synchro springboard and reached the final of the 1 metre springboard.
