= Jette Müller =

German diver (born 2003)

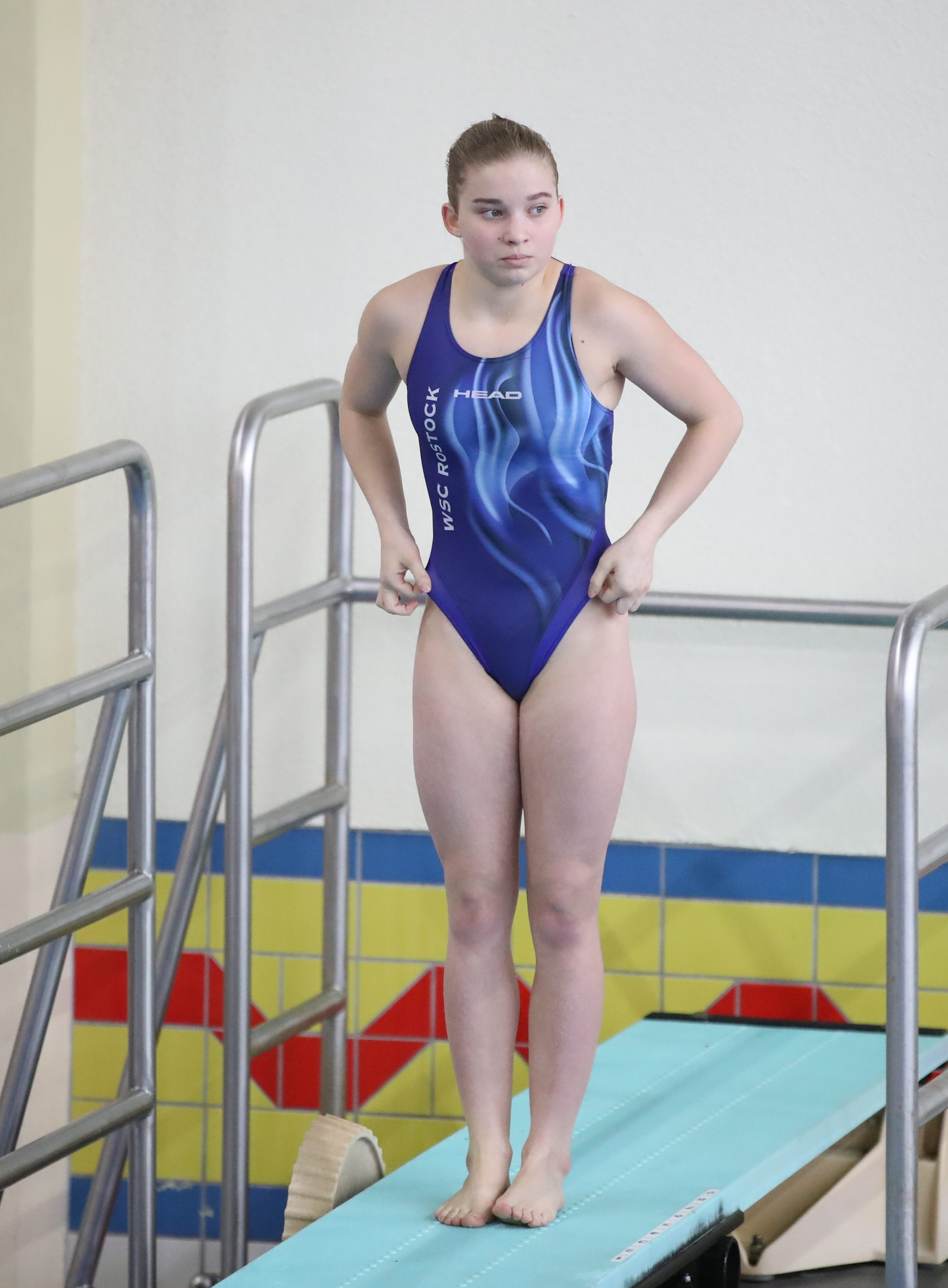

Personal information
- Born: 1 October 2003 (age 23) Rostock, Germany

Sport
- Country: Germany
- Sport: Diving
- Event: 1 m
- Club: WSC Rostock
Medal record
Women's diving
Representing Germany
European Aquatics Championships
Bronze medal – third place	2026 Paris	3 m synchro
European Diving Championships
Silver medal – second place	2025 Antalya	3 m synchro
World University Games
Gold medal – first place	2025 Rhine-Ruhr	Mixed team
Bronze medal – third place	2025 Rhine-Ruhr	3 m synchro

Jette Müller (born 1 October 2003) is a German diver.

== Diving career ==
Müller participated in the World Junior Diving Championships 2018 and 2021. In the 2021 FINA World Junior Diving Championships, she won two gold medals (Girls A 1 m and Girls A 3 m).

She missed the German championships in 2021 due to a thumb injury, which made it impossible for her to qualify for the 2020 Summer Olympics in Tokyo.

Müller represented Germany at the 2022 World Aquatics Championships in Budapest, where she finished 7th in the women's 1 m springboard event. She finished 4th in the 1 m event at the 2022 European Aquatics Championships in Rome.

She competed at the 2024 Summer Olympics where she came 6th in the 3 metre springboard event alongside Lena Hentschel.

== Diving achievements ==
Senior

Competition	Event	2022	2023	2024
International representing Germany
Olympics Games	3m Springboard Synchro	—N/a		6th
FINA World Aquatics Championships	1m Springboard	7th	10th	4th
FINA World Aquatics Championships	3m Springboard Synchro			6th
FINA Diving World Cup	3m Springboard	14th		
European Aquatics Championships / European Diving Championships	1m Springboard	4th	7th	

Junior

Competition	Event	2018	2019	2020	2021
International representing Germany
FINA World Junior Diving Championships	1m Springboard	14th			1st place, gold medalist(s)
FINA World Junior Diving Championships	3m Springboard	13th			1st place, gold medalist(s)
FINA World Junior Diving Championships	3m Springboard Synchro				5th
FINA World Junior Diving Championships	Team Event				8th
European Junior Diving Championships	1m Springboard				4th
European Junior Diving Championships	3m Springboard				9th
European Junior Diving Championships	3m Springboard Synchro				4th
