= Chiara Pellacani =

Italian diver (born 2002)

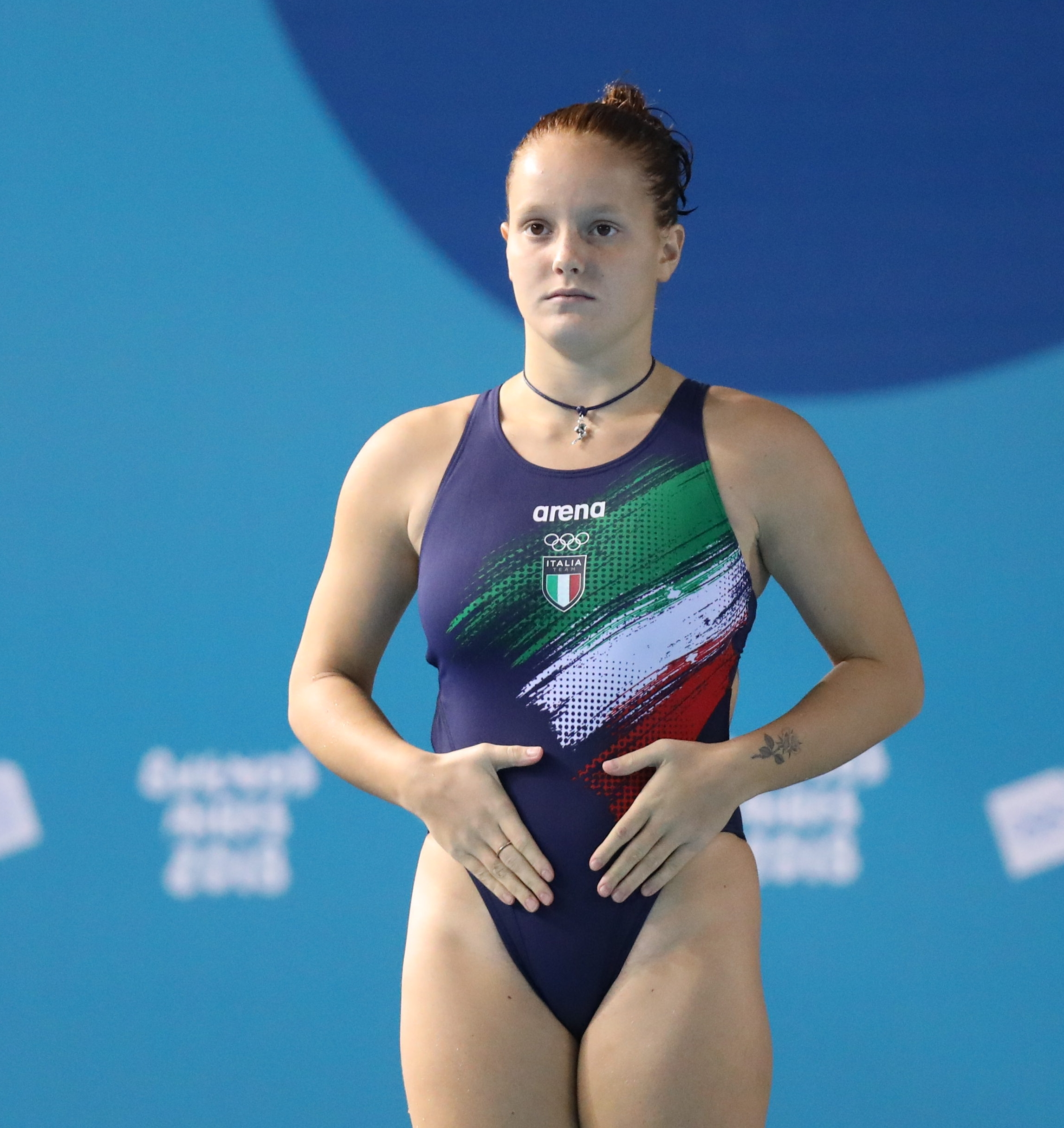

Personal information
- Born: 12 September 2002 (age 23) Rome, Italy
- Height: 155 cm (5 ft 1 in)
- Weight: 53 kg (117 lb)

Sport
- Country: Italy
- Sport: Diving
- Event: 3 m synchro
- College team: Louisiana State University University of Miami https://miamihurricanes.com/roster/chiara-pellacani/
Medal record
Event	1st	2nd	3rd
Olympic Games	0	0	0
World Championships	1	2	4
European Championships	11	5	4
European Games	2	1	1
Total	14	8	9
World Championships
Gold medal – first place	2025 Singapore	3 m mixed synchro
Silver medal – second place	2022 Budapest	3 m mixed synchro
Silver medal – second place	2024 Doha	3 m mixed synchro
Bronze medal – third place	2023 Fukuoka	3 m synchro
Bronze medal – third place	2023 Fukuoka	3 m mixed synchro
Bronze medal – third place	2025 Singapore	1 m springboard
Bronze medal – third place	2025 Singapore	3 m springboard
European Games
Gold medal – first place	2023 Kraków-Małopolska	3 m springboard
Gold medal – first place	2023 Kraków-Małopolska	3 m mixed synchro
Silver medal – second place	2023 Kraków-Małopolska	Team
Bronze medal – third place	2023 Kraków-Małopolska	3 m synchro
European Championships
Gold medal – first place	2018 Glasgow	3 m synchro
Gold medal – first place	2020 Budapest	3 m mixed synchro
Gold medal – first place	2022 Rome	Team event
Gold medal – first place	2022 Rome	3 m springboard
Gold medal – first place	2026 Paris	Team event
Gold medal – first place	2026 Paris	3 m mixed synchro
Gold medal – first place	2026 Paris	1 m springboard
Gold medal – first place	2026 Paris	3 m springboard
Gold medal – first place	2026 Paris	3 m synchro
Silver medal – second place	2020 Budapest	3 m springboard
Silver medal – second place	2020 Budapest	3 m synchro
Silver medal – second place	2020 Budapest	Team event
Silver medal – second place	2022 Rome	3 m synchro
Bronze medal – third place	2020 Budapest	1 m springboard
Bronze medal – third place	2022 Rome	1 m springboard
Bronze medal – third place	2022 Rome	3 m mixed synchro
European Diving Championships
Gold medal – first place	2019 Kyiv	10 m synchro
Gold medal – first place	2025 Antalya	1 m springboard
Silver medal – second place	2025 Antalya	3 m mixed synchro
Bronze medal – third place	2025 Antalya	Team

Chiara Pellacani (born 12 September 2002) is an Italian diver.

== Career ==
She won a gold medal in the 3 m synchro springboard competition at the 2018 European Aquatics Championships. At the 2020 European Aquatics Championships in Budapest, Hungary, Pellacani won five medals, of which one was gold.

She competed at the 2024 Summer Olympics where she came 4th in the 3 metre springboard event alongside Elena Bertocchi.

She won five gold medals in five competitions at the 2026 European Aquatics Championships in Paris.

== International championships ==
Meet	1 m springboard	3 m springboard	3 m synchronised	3 m mixed synchronised	mixed team
Junior level
EJC 2016	3rd place, bronze medalist(s)			—N/a	2nd place, silver medalist(s)
EJC 2017		1st place, gold medalist(s)		—N/a	3rd place, bronze medalist(s)
EJC 2019	3rd place, bronze medalist(s)			—N/a	
Senior level
EC 2018			1st place, gold medalist(s)		
EC 2019					
EC 2020	3rd place, bronze medalist(s)	2nd place, silver medalist(s)	2nd place, silver medalist(s)	1st place, gold medalist(s)	2nd place, silver medalist(s)
WC 2022				2nd place, silver medalist(s)	
EC 2022	3rd place, bronze medalist(s)	1st place, gold medalist(s)	2nd place, silver medalist(s)	3rd place, bronze medalist(s)	1st place, gold medalist(s)
EG 2023 / EC 2023		1st place, gold medalist(s)	3rd place, bronze medalist(s)	1st place, gold medalist(s)	2nd place, silver medalist(s)
WC 2023			3rd place, bronze medalist(s)	3rd place, bronze medalist(s)	
WC 2024				2nd place, silver medalist(s)	
EC 2025	1st place, gold medalist(s)			2nd place, silver medalist(s)	3rd place, bronze medalist(s)
WC 2025	3rd place, bronze medalist(s)	3rd place, bronze medalist(s)		1st place, gold medalist(s)	
EC 2026	1st place, gold medalist(s)	1st place, gold medalist(s)	1st place, gold medalist(s)	1st place, gold medalist(s)	1st place, gold medalist(s)
