= Elizaveta Kuzina =

Russian diver (born 2003)

Personal information
- Born: 9 May 2003 (age 23) Elektrostal, Moscow region, Russia

Sport
- Country: Russia
- Sport: Diving
Medal record
Women's diving
Representing Neutral Athletes B
European Championships
Silver medal – second place	2026 Paris	Mixed 3 m

Elizaveta Igorevna Kuzina (Russian: Елизавета Игоревна Кузина; born 9 May 2003) is a Russian diver.

== Early life ==
Kuzina was born in Elektrostal, Moscow region.

== Career ==
At the 2026 European Aquatics Championships, she won the silver medal in the mixed 3 m springboard synchro event, pairing with Ilia Molchanov.
