= Michelle Heimberg =

Swiss diver (born 2000)

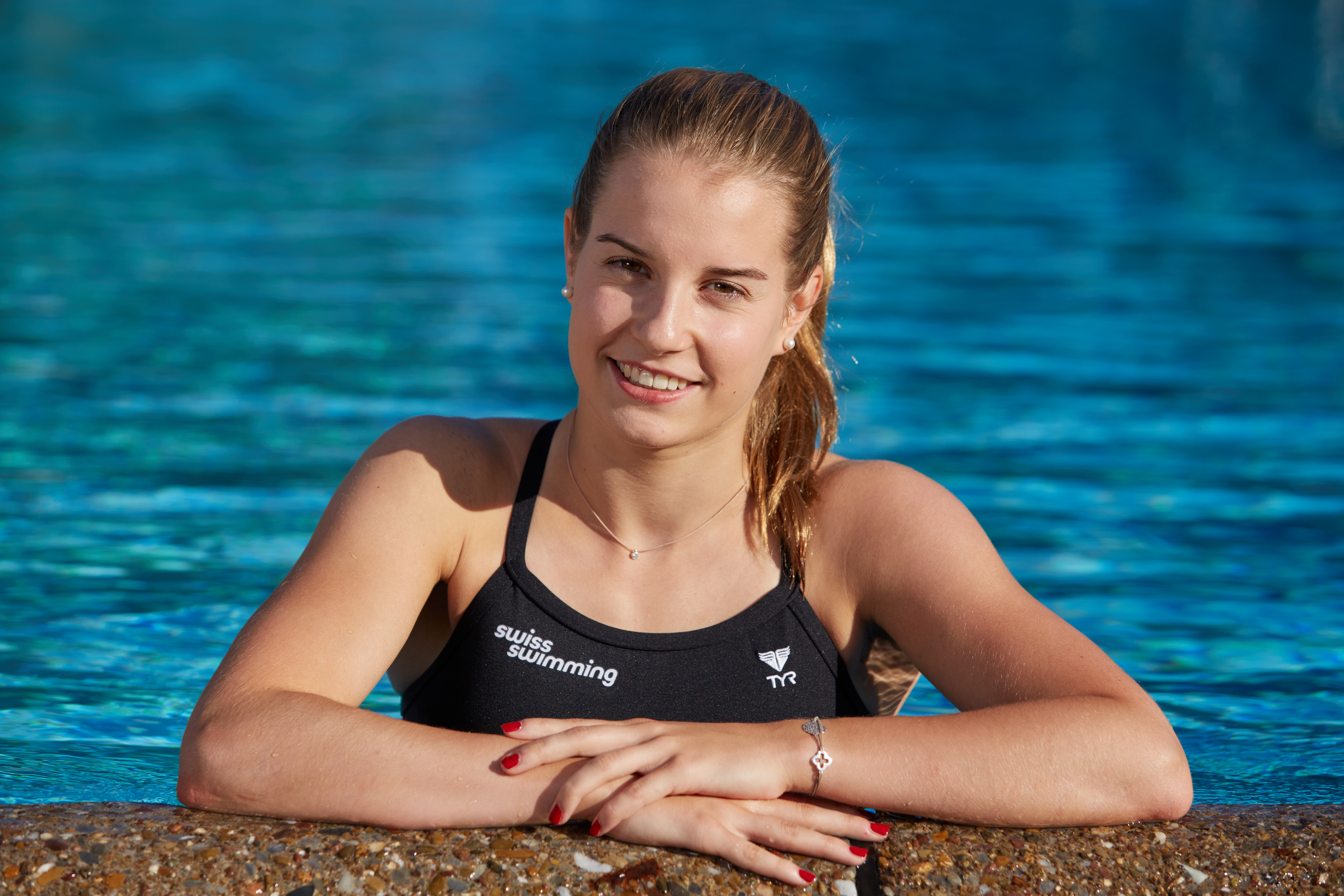

Personal information
- Nationality: Swiss
- Born: 2 June 2000 (age 26) Wettingen, Switzerland

Sport
- Sport: Diving
Medal record
European Games
Gold medal – first place	2023 Kraków-Małopolska	1 m springboard
Bronze medal – third place	2023 Kraków-Małopolska	3 m springboard
European Championships
Silver medal – second place	2020 Budapest	1 m springboard
Silver medal – second place	2022 Rome	3 m springboard
Silver medal – second place	2026 Paris	1 m springboard
European Diving Championships
Gold medal – first place	2023 Rzeszów	1 m springboard
Gold medal – first place	2025 Antalya	3 m springboard
Silver medal – second place	2017 Kyiv	3 m springboard
Bronze medal – third place	2019 Kyiv	3 m mixed synchro
Bronze medal – third place	2023 Rzeszów	3 m springboard
Bronze medal – third place	2025 Antalya	1 m springboard

Michelle Heimberg (born 2 June 2000) is a Swiss diver. She competed in the women's 1 metre springboard event at the 2019 World Aquatics Championships. She finished in 16th place in the preliminary round. In the women's 3 metre springboard event she finished in 28th place in the preliminary round.
