= Anne Vilde Tuxen =

Norwegian diver

Personal information
- Nationality: Norwegian
- Born: 27 February 1998 (age 28) Tananger, Norway

Sport
- Sport: Diving
- Club: Pingvin

Anne Vilde Tuxen (born 27 February 1998) is a Norwegian competitive diver, born in Tananger. She qualified to represent Norway at the 2020 Summer Olympics in Tokyo 2021, competing in women's 10 metre platform. She finished 28th in the event with a score of 219.15.

Olympic Games
Preceded by Ole-Kristian Bryhn	Flagbearer for Norway; Tokyo 2020; With: Tomoe Zenimoto Hvas	Succeeded by Katrine Lunde; Christian Sørum
