= Kseniia Bochek =

Ukrainian diver (born 2009)

Personal information
- Native name: Ксенія Бочек
- Born: 24 March 2009 (age 17)

Sport
- Country: Ukraine
- Sport: Diving
Medal record
Women's diving
Representing Ukraine
European Championships
Gold medal – first place	2025 Antalya	3 m synchro
Silver medal – second place	2026 Paris	3 m synchro
Bronze medal – third place	2026 Paris	Team

Kseniia Bochek (Ukrainian: Ксенія Бочек; born 24 March 2009) is a Ukrainian diver.

== Career ==
In May 2025, Bochek competed at the 2025 European Diving Championships and won a gold medal in the 3 metre synchro event, along with Diana Karnafel, with a score of 276.84 points. She again competed at the 2026 European Aquatics Championships and won a silver medal in the 3 metre synchro event, along with Bochek, with a score of 278.40 points. She was also part of the Ukrainian team that won a bronze medal in the team event.
