= Diana Karnafel =

Ukrainian diver (born 2007)

Personal information
- Native name: Діана Карнафель
- Nationality: Ukrainian
- Born: 8 January 2007 (age 19)

Sport
- Country: Ukraine
- Sport: Diving
Medal record
Women's diving
Representing Ukraine
European Championships
Gold medal – first place	2025 Antalya	3 m synchro
Silver medal – second place	2026 Paris	3 m synchro
World Junior Championships
Gold medal – first place	2024 Rio de Janeiro	3 m springboard

Diana Karnafel (Ukrainian: Діана Карнафель; born 8 January 2007) is a Ukrainian diver.

== Career ==
In May 2025, Karnafel competed at the 2025 European Diving Championships and won a gold medal in the 3 metre synchro event, along with Kseniia Bochek, with a score of 276.84 points. She again competed at the 2026 European Aquatics Championships and won a silver medal in the 3 metre synchro event, along with Bochek, with a score of 278.40 points.
