= 2026 European Aquatics Championships =

Water sport competitions

38th European Aquatics Championships
- Host city: Paris, France
- Date: 31 July – 16 August 2026
- Venue(s): Paris Aquatic Centre (artistic swimming, diving & swimming); Grenelle, Pont de Bir-Hakeim (open water swimming & high diving)

The 2026 European Aquatics Championships were held in Paris, France, from 31 July to 16 August 2026.

== Schedule ==
A total of 74 medal events are held across 5 disciplines. Para Swimming makes its European Aquatics debut with 4 multi-class medal events added to the swimming schedule. Competition dates by discipline are:

- Swimming: 10–16 August
- Open water swimming: 4–8 August
- Artistic swimming: 31 July–5 August
- Diving: 31 July–6 August
- High diving: 7–8 August

●	Finals

July & August	31	1	2	3	4	5	6	7	8	9	10	11	12	13	14	15	16	Total
Swimming											3	6	7	5	6	7	9	43
Open water swimming					2	2		2	1									7
Artistic swimming	2	2	1	3	2	1												11
Diving	1	2	2	2	2	2	2											13
High diving									2									2
Total	3	4	3	5	6	5	2	2	3	0	3	6	7	5	6	7	9	76
Cumulative Total	3	7	10	15	21	26	28	30	33	33	36	42	49	54	60	67	76	76

== Venues ==
The main venue of the competition is the Centre Aquatique Olympique Métropole du Grand Paris in Saint-Denis, which hosts the swimming, diving and artistic swimming events. The venue, built for the 2024 Summer Olympics, has a spectator capacity of up to 5,000.

The open water swimming competitions are held in the Seine at the Bras de Grenelle, while the high diving events take place at Port Debilly, also on the Seine in central Paris.

Venue	Events	Capacity	Photo	Map
● Centre Aquatique Olympique Métropole du Grand Paris (Saint-Denis)	Swimming; Diving; Artistic swimming	5,000		Paris and its inner ring départements
● Bras de Grenelle (Paris)	Open water swimming	—		Paris and its inner ring départements
● Port Debilly (Paris)	High diving	—		Paris and its inner ring départements

== Overall medal table ==
* Host nation (France)

Rank	Nation	Gold	Silver	Bronze	Total
1	Great Britain	14	4	8	26
2	Italy	13	15	15	43
3	Neutral Athletes B (Note: In accordance with sanctions imposed following the 2022 Russian invasion of Ukraine, athletes from Russia were not permitted to use the name, flag, or anthem of the Russian Federation. They instead participated as "Neutral Athletes B (NAB)" and under the European Aquatics flag.)	10	9	13	32
4	Germany	9	11	12	32
5	Hungary	5	9	3	17
6	France*	4	6	5	15
7	Ukraine	3	1	3	7
8	Greece	3	1	1	5
9	Romania	3	0	0	3
10	Netherlands	2	7	1	10
11	Ireland	2	1	2	5
12	Czech Republic	2	0	0	2
13	Spain	1	6	4	11
14	Belgium	1	1	1	3
14	Neutral Athletes A (Note: In accordance with sanctions imposed following the 2022 Russian invasion of Ukraine, athletes from Belarus were not permitted to use the name, flag, or anthem of the Republic of Belarus. They instead participated as "Neutral Athletes A (NAA)" and under the European Aquatics flag.)	1	1	1	3
14	Sweden	1	1	1	3
17	Lithuania	1	1	0	2
18	Poland	1	0	1	2
19	Switzerland	0	1	1	2
20	Denmark	0	1	0	1
20	Portugal	0	1	0	1
20	Serbia	0	1	0	1
23	Austria	0	0	1	1
23	Croatia	0	0	1	1
Totals (24 entries)		76	78	74	228

== Results ==
=== Swimming ===
* Host nation (France)

Rank	Nation	Gold	Silver	Bronze	Total
1	Great Britain	8	2	4	14
2	Italy	6	8	6	20
3	Neutral Athletes B	5	5	9	19
4	France*	4	4	3	11
5	Hungary	4	4	2	10
6	Netherlands	2	7	0	9
7	Germany	2	6	6	14
8	Ireland	2	1	2	5
9	Czech Republic	2	0	0	2
9	Romania	2	0	0	2
11	Belgium	1	1	1	3
11	Greece	1	1	1	3
11	Sweden	1	1	1	3
14	Lithuania	1	1	0	2
15	Poland	1	0	1	2
16	Ukraine	1	0	0	1
17	Spain	0	1	1	2
18	Denmark	0	1	0	1
18	Portugal	0	1	0	1
18	Serbia	0	1	0	1
21	Austria	0	0	1	1
21	Croatia	0	0	1	1
21	Neutral Athletes A	0	0	1	1
21	Switzerland	0	0	1	1
Totals (24 entries)		43	45	41	129

==== Men ====
Event	Gold		Silver		Bronze	
50 m freestyle	Nikita Sheremet; Ukraine	21.13; NR	Egor Kornev; Neutral Athletes B Andrej Barna; Serbia	21.37 NR	Not awarded	
100 m freestyle	David Popovici; Romania	46.56; CR	Egor Kornev; Neutral Athletes B	46.74; NR (Note: Athlete or team set a Russian record, though they were representing "Neutral Athletes B (NAB)" under the European Aquatics flag.)	Kristóf Milák; Hungary	46.87; NR
200 m freestyle	David Popovici; Romania	1:44.15	Tomas Navikonis; Lithuania	1:44.55	James Guy; Great Britain	1:44.87
400 m freestyle	Léon Marchand; France	3:43.14; NR	Olivér Pápai; Hungary	3:44.46; NR	Lukas Märtens; Germany	3:44.57
800 m freestyle	Johannes Liebmann; Germany	7:37.59; ER, CR	Sven Schwarz; Germany	7:41.16	Zalán Sárkány; Hungary	7:41.75; NR
1500 m freestyle	Johannes Liebmann; Germany	14:26.79; WR	Zalán Sárkány; Hungary	14:39.45; NR	Oliver Klemet; Germany	14:40.64
50 m backstroke	Miroslav Knedla; Czech Republic	24.11; NR	Kliment Kolesnikov; Neutral Athletes B	24.12	Pavel Samusenko; Neutral Athletes B	24.14
100 m backstroke	Apostolos Christou; Greece	52.27	Thomas Ceccon; Italy	52.28	Pavel Samusenko; Neutral Athletes B	52.57
200 m backstroke	Hubert Kós; Hungary	1:53.08	Apostolos Siskos; Greece	1:53.81; NR	Thomas Ceccon; Italy	1:53.96; NR
50 m breaststroke	Nicolò Martinenghi; Italy	26.57	Koen de Groot; Netherlands Simone Cerasuolo; Italy	NR 26.62	Not awarded	
100 m breaststroke	Nicolò Martinenghi; Italy	58.58	Ivan Kozhakin; Neutral Athletes B	58.68	Simone Cerasuolo; Italy	58.90
200 m breaststroke	Filip Nowacki; Great Britain	2:07.70	Caspar Corbeau; Netherlands	2:07.78	Luka Mladenovic; Austria	2:08.91
50 m butterfly	Egor Kornev; Neutral Athletes B	22.52	Maxime Grousset; France	22.54	Hryhory Pekarski; Neutral Athletes A	22.68; NR (Note: Athlete set a Belarusian record, though they were representing "Neutral Athletes A (NAA)" under the European Aquatics flag.)
100 m butterfly	Kristóf Milák; Hungary	49.48; ER, CR	Maxime Grousset; France	49.70	Noè Ponti; Switzerland	49.93
200 m butterfly	Léon Marchand; France	1:51.72	Richárd Márton; Hungary	1:54.06	Apostolos Siskos; Greece	1:54.13; NR
200 m individual medley	Hubert Kós; Hungary	1:54.24; CR, NR	Hugo González; Spain	1:54.44; NR	Mikhail Shcherbakov; Neutral Athletes B	1:56.16; WJ, NR
400 m individual medley	Ilya Borodin; Neutral Athletes B	4:08.17; CR	Alberto Razzetti; Italy	4:10.40	Max Litchfield; Great Britain	4:11.58
4 × 100 m freestyle relay	Hungary; Hubert Kós (48.18); Szebasztián Szabó (48.29); Nándor Németh (47.27); Kristóf Milák (46.29); Olivér Kós; Ádám Jászó	3:10.03; CR, NR	Neutral Athletes B Ivan Giryov (48.14); Vasilii Kukushkin (47.77); Aleksandr Shchegolev (47.89); Egor Kornev (46.32); Mikhail Shcherbakov; Roman Zhidkov; Andrey Minakov	3:10.12	Croatia; Jere Hribar (47.77); Vlaho Nenadić (47.96); Vili Sivec (48.24); Toni Dragoja (47.11)	3:11.08; NR
4 × 200 m freestyle relay	Great Britain; Matthew Richards (1:45.44); Jack McMillan (1:46.62); James Guy (1:44.07); Duncan Scott (1:45.39); Tyler Melbourne-Smith; Thomas Dean; Gabriel Shepherd	7:01.52; CR	France; Léon Marchand (1:43.76); Pierre Largeron (1:47.44); Sauveur Cristofini (1:45.28); Roman Fuchs (1:45.75); Néo Dutriaux	7:02.23; NR	Germany; Lukas Märtens (1:45.71); Timo Sorgius (1:45.63); Jarno Baschnitt (1:45.10); Cornelius Jahn (1:45.84)	7:02.28; NR
4 × 100 m medley relay	Neutral Athletes B Kliment Kolesnikov (53.00); Ivan Kozhakin (58.48); Andrey Minakov (50.34); Egor Kornev (46.85); Pavel Samusenko; Kirill Prigoda; Roman Shevliakov; Vasilii Kukushkin	3:28.67	Italy; Thomas Ceccon (52.72); Nicolò Martinenghi (58.00); Alberto Razzetti (51.13); Carlos D'Ambrosio (47.01); Michele Lamberti; Michele Busa	3:28.86	France; Yohann Ndoye-Brouard (53.05); Carl Aitkaci (59.43); Léon Marchand (49.64); Maxime Grousset (46.91); Mewen Tomac; Amaury Albar; Cédric Gabali	3:29.03

==== Women ====
Event	Gold		Silver		Bronze	
50 m freestyle	Katarzyna Wasick; Poland	23.84; NR	Sarah Sjöström; Sweden	23.86	Sara Curtis; Italy	23.99; NR
100 m freestyle	Marrit Steenbergen; Netherlands	51.90; CR	Milou van Wijk; Netherlands	52.71	Sara Curtis; Italy	52.72
200 m freestyle	Barbora Seemanová; Czech Republic	1:54.38; CR, NR	Marrit Steenbergen; Netherlands	1:54.65; NR	Freya Colbert; Great Britain	1:55.81
400 m freestyle	Simona Quadarella; Italy	4:01.34; CR	Isabel Gose; Germany	4:02.41	Maya Werner; Germany	4:03.73
800 m freestyle	Simona Quadarella; Italy	8:15.55	Isabel Gose; Germany	8:18.44	Maya Werner; Germany	8:22.55
1500 m freestyle	Simona Quadarella; Italy	15:46.22; CR	Isabel Gose; Germany	15:49.31	Maya Werner; Germany	15:52.50
50 m backstroke	Sara Curtis; Italy	26.56; WR	Mary-Ambre Moluh; France	27.06; NR	Lauren Cox; Great Britain	27.15 =NR
100 m backstroke	Mary-Ambre Moluh; France	57.94; ER, CR	Marrit Steenbergen; Netherlands	58.46	Pauline Mahieu; France	58.77
200 m backstroke	Katie Shanahan; Great Britain	2:06.13; NR	Camila Rebelo; Portugal	2:07.62; NR	Pauline Mahieu; France	2:08.63
50 m breaststroke	Rūta Meilutytė; Lithuania	29.93	Benedetta Pilato; Italy	29.94	Mona McSharry; Ireland	29.95; NR
100 m breaststroke	Angharad Evans; Great Britain	1:04.87; CR, NR	Mona McSharry; Ireland	1:05.41; NR	Benedetta Pilato; Italy	1:05.89
200 m breaststroke	Evgeniia Chikunova; Neutral Athletes B	2:19.32; CR	Angharad Evans; Great Britain	2:21.21	Mona McSharry; Ireland	2:22.43
50 m butterfly	Sarah Sjöström; Sweden	25.05	Roos Vanotterdijk; Belgium	25.12; NR	Sara Junevik; Sweden	25.51
100 m butterfly	Roos Vanotterdijk; Belgium	56.08	Angelina Köhler; Germany	56.39	Daria Klepikova; Neutral Athletes B	56.76
200 m butterfly	Keanna MacInnes; Great Britain	2:05.90	Helena Rosendahl Bach; Denmark	2:06.14; NR	Laura Cabanes; Spain	2:07.21
200 m individual medley	Ellen Walshe; Ireland	2:09.81; NR	Anita Gastaldi; Italy	2:10.07	Roos Vanotterdijk; Belgium	2:10.10
400 m individual medley	Ellen Walshe; Ireland	4:34.42; NR	Amalie Smith; Great Britain	4:35.12	Justina Kozan; Poland	4:36.47; NR
4 × 100 m freestyle relay	Netherlands; Milou van Wijk (53.40); Imani de Jong (53.47); Yara van Kalmthout (53.68); Marrit Steenbergen (51.34); Tessa Giele; Femke Spiering	3:31.89; CR	Italy; Emma Virginia Menicucci (53.85); Sara Curtis (52.29); Chiara Tarantino (53.68); Alessandra Mao (53.37); Sofia Morini	3:33.19; NR	Neutral Athletes B Daria Klepikova (53.22); Alexandra Kuznetsova (53.85); Alina Gaifutdinova (53.54); Kira Manokhina (53.08); Dariia Surushkina; Kseniia Sorokina	3:33.69; NR
4 × 200 m freestyle relay	Great Britain; Freya Colbert (1:55.65); Abbie Wood (1:56.72); Leah Schlosshan (1:56.80); Freya Anderson (1:56.76); Theodora Taylor; Amalie Smith	7:45.93; CR	Hungary; Nikolett Pádár (1:57.31); Lilla Minna Ábrahám (1:57.22); Ajna Késely (1:58.56); Panna Ugrai (1:56.00)	7:49.09	Neutral Athletes B Kseniia Misharina (1:57.10); Sofia Diakova (1:57.70); Dariia Surushkina (1:58.54); Daria Klepikova (1:55.79); Milana Stepanova	7:49.13
4 × 100 m medley relay	Great Britain; Lauren Cox (59.67); Angharad Evans (1:03.75); Keanna Macinnes (56.81); Freya Colbert (53.27); Katie Shanahan; Emily Richards; Theodora Taylor	3:53.50; CR	Italy; Sara Curtis (58.43); Benedetta Pilato (1:04.53); Anita Gastaldi (57.07); Emma Virginia Menicucci (53.57); Lisa Angiolini	3:53.60; NR	Neutral Athletes B Alina Gaifutdinova (59.14); Evgeniia Chikunova (1:05.45); Daria Klepikova (55.65); Kira Manokhina (53.55); Yuliya Yefimova; Arina Surkova; Alexandra Kuznetsova	3:53.79

==== Mixed events ====
Event	Gold		Silver		Bronze	
4 × 100 m mixed freestyle relay	Neutral Athletes B Egor Kornev (47.05); Ivan Giryov (47.67); Daria Klepikova (52.21); Kira Manokhina (53.02); Roman Zhidkov; Vasilii Kukushkin; Dariia Surushkina; Kseniia Sorokina	3:19.95; CR	Netherlands; Sean Niewold (47.95); Merlin Belmon (48.55); Milou van Wijk (52.85); Marrit Steenbergen (50.74); Brandon van den Berg; Yara van Kalmthout; Imani de Jong	3:20.09; NR	Italy; Carlos D'Ambrosio (47.86); Thomas Ceccon (47.56); Sara Curtis (51.79); Emma Virginia Menicucci (53.59); Manuel Frigo; Alessandra Mao	3:20.80; NR
4 × 200 m mixed freestyle relay	Great Britain; Jack McMillan (1:47.09); Matt Richards (1:45.85); Freya Colbert (1:55.23); Freya Anderson (1:55.96); Leah Schlosshan; Tyler Melbourne-Smith	7:24.13; CR	Germany; Lukas Märtens (1:46.73); Jarno Baschnitt (1:45.87); Linda Roth (1:57.18); Maya Tobehn (1:55.65); Timo Sorgius; Nicole Maier	7:25.43	Neutral Athletes B Grigorii Vekovishchev (1:47.52); Ivan Giryov (1:45.65); Daria Klepikova (1:55.98); Kseniia Misharina (1:57.20); Roman Akimov; Andrei Cherepkov; Sofia Diakova	7:26.35
4 × 100 m mixed medley relay	France; Mary-Ambre Moluh (57.99); Carl Aitkaci (59.05); Maxime Grousset (49.66); Marie Wattel (52.94); Amaury Albar; Albane Cachot	3:39.64; NR	Netherlands; Maaike de Waard (59.89); Caspar Corbeau (59.03); Sean Niewold (51.13); Marrit Steenbergen (50.87); Koen de Groet; Tessa Giele	3:40.92; NR	Neutral Athletes B Kliment Kolesnikov (52.45); Kirill Prigoda (58.24); Daria Klepikova (57.38); Alexandra Kuznetsova (53.45); Pavel Samusenko; Ivan Kozhakin; Arina Surkova; Alina Gaifutdinova	3:41.52

=== Diving ===
==== Medal table ====
* Host nation (France)

Rank	Nation	Gold	Silver	Bronze	Total
1	Italy	5	1	1	7
2	Germany	3	4	3	10
3	Neutral Athletes B	2	3	1	6
4	Great Britain	2	2	3	7
5	Ukraine	1	1	3	5
6	France*	0	1	0	1
6	Switzerland	0	1	0	1
8	Netherlands	0	0	1	1
8	Spain	0	0	1	1
Totals (9 entries)		13	13	13	39

==== Men ====
Event	Gold		Silver		Bronze	
1 m springboard	Moritz Wesemann; Germany	431.45	Jack Laugher; Great Britain	418.25	Jordan Houlden; Great Britain	410.30
3 m springboard	Moritz Wesemann; Germany	506.80	Jules Bouyer; France	484.60	Jordan Houlden; Great Britain	474.90
3 m springboard synchro	Germany; Lou Massenberg; Jonathan Schauer	423.84	Neutral Athletes B Evgeny Kuznetsov; Nikita Shleikher	408.99	Italy; Stefano Belotti; Matteo Santoro	386.07
10 m platform	Ruslan Ternovoi; Neutral Athletes B	524.20	Jaden Eikermann; Germany	513.05	Ole Rösler; Germany	480.75
10 m platform synchro	Neutral Athletes B Nikita Shleikher; Ruslan Ternovoi	443.82	Italy; Simone Conte; Raffaele Pelligra	416.46	Ukraine; Mark Hrytsenko; Oleksiy Sereda	406.05

==== Women ====
Event	Gold		Silver		Bronze	
1 m springboard	Chiara Pellacani; Italy	298.90	Michelle Heimberg; Switzerland	258.80	Desharne Bent-Ashmeil; Great Britain	254.35
3 m springboard	Chiara Pellacani; Italy	358.05	Yasmin Harper; Great Britain	318.70	Nadezhda Trifonova; Neutral Athletes B	312.40
3 m springboard synchro	Italy; Chiara Pellacani; Elisa Pizzini	308.07	Ukraine; Kseniia Bochek; Diana Karnafel	278.40	Germany; Lena Hentschel; Jette Müller	274.59
10 m platform	Maisie Bond; Great Britain	327.05	Pauline Pfeif; Germany	305.30	Else Praasterink; Netherlands	305.15
10 m platform synchro	Great Britain; Maisie Bond; Lois Toulson	300.06	Germany; Pauline Pfeif; Elena Wassen	298.20	Ukraine; Kseniia Bailo; Sofiia Vystavkina	286.20

==== Mixed events ====
Event	Gold		Silver		Bronze	
Mixed 3 m springboard synchro	Italy; Chiara Pellacani; Matteo Santoro	305.85	Neutral Athletes B Elizaveta Kuzina; Ilia Molchanov	286.17	Germany; Lena Hentschel; Luis Avila Sanchez	284.19
Mixed 10 m platform synchro	Ukraine; Oleksii Sereda; Kseniia Bailo	323.16	Germany; Ole Rösler; Pauline Pfeif	317.76	Spain; Jorge Rodríguez; Ana Carvajal	297.48
Team event	Italy; Chiara Pellacani; Matteo Santoro; Sarah Jodoin Di Maria; Raffaele Pelligra	410.60	Neutral Athletes B Nadezhda Trifonova; Grigorii Ivanov; Ekaterina Beliaeva; Ruslan Ternovoi	385.80	Ukraine; Kseniia Bochek; Kirill Boliukh; Oleksiy Sereda; Kseniya Baylo	368.20

=== High diving ===
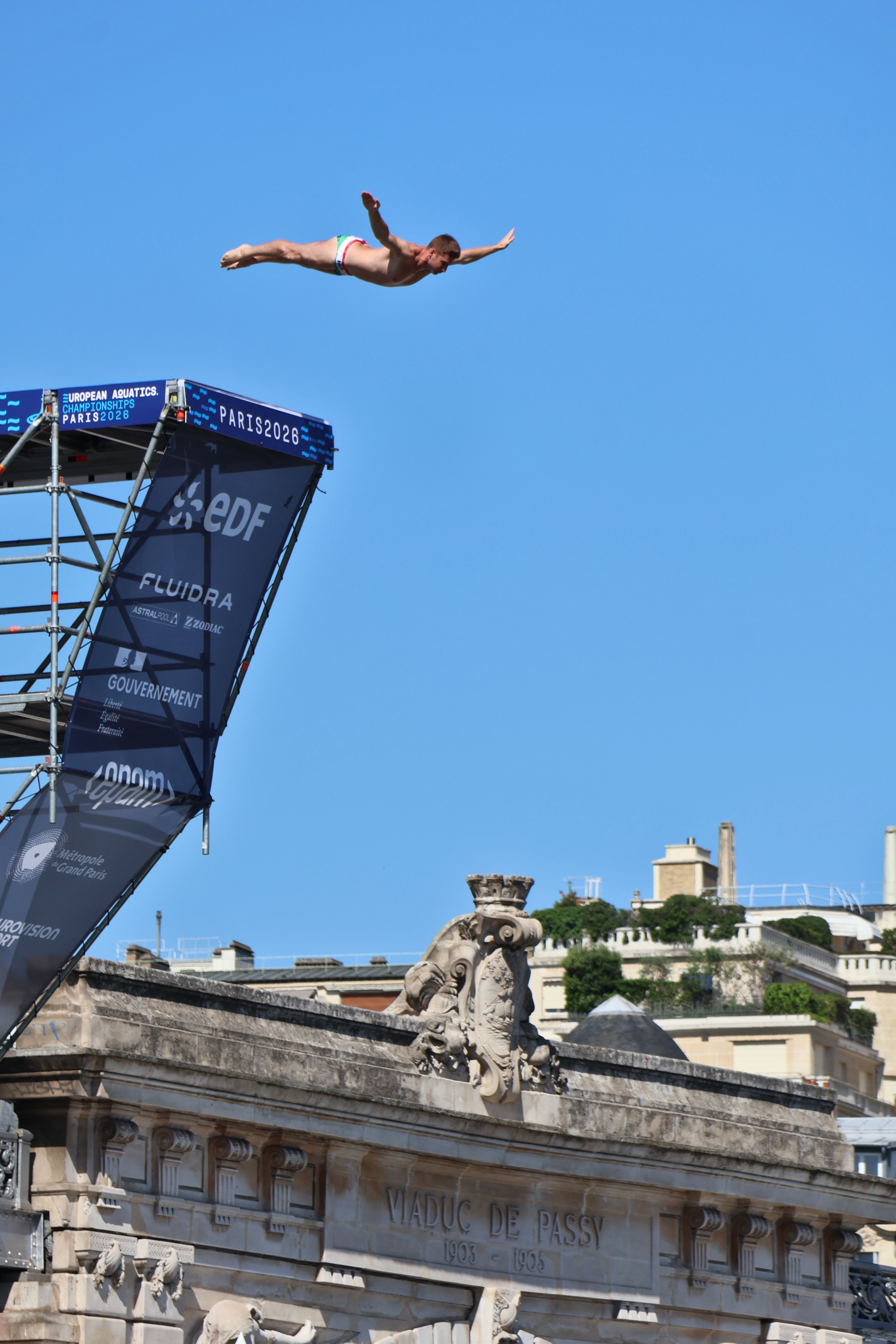
High diving, 20 meter for men

==== Medal table ====
* Host nation (France)

Rank	Nation	Gold	Silver	Bronze	Total
1	Romania	1	0	0	1
1	Ukraine	1	0	0	1
3	Italy	0	2	0	2
4	France*	0	0	1	1
4	Germany	0	0	1	1
Totals (5 entries)		2	2	2	6

==== Results ====
Event	Gold		Silver		Bronze	
Men	Cătălin Preda; Romania	411.60	Andrea Barnabà; Italy	386.00	Gary Hunt; France	382.50
Women	Nelli Chukanivska; Ukraine	324.70	Elisa Cosetti; Italy	297.20	Maike Halbisch; Germany	292.15

=== Open water swimming ===
==== Medal table ====
* Host nation (France)

Rank	Nation	Gold	Silver	Bronze	Total
1	Germany	4	0	1	5
2	Italy	2	1	4	7
3	Hungary	1	5	1	7
4	France*	0	1	1	2
Totals (4 entries)		7	7	7	21

==== Men ====
Event	Gold		Silver		Bronze	
3 km knockout sprint	Dávid Betlehem; Hungary	6:12.97	Marc-Antoine Olivier; France	6:16.26	Logan Fontaine; France	6:16.47
5 km	Florian Wellbrock; Germany	55:40.25	Dávid Betlehem; Hungary	55:42.62	Gregorio Paltrinieri; Italy	55:44.76
10 km	Florian Wellbrock; Germany	1:55:18.39	Dávid Betlehem; Hungary	1:55:20.53	Oliver Klemet; Germany	1:55:24.84

==== Women ====
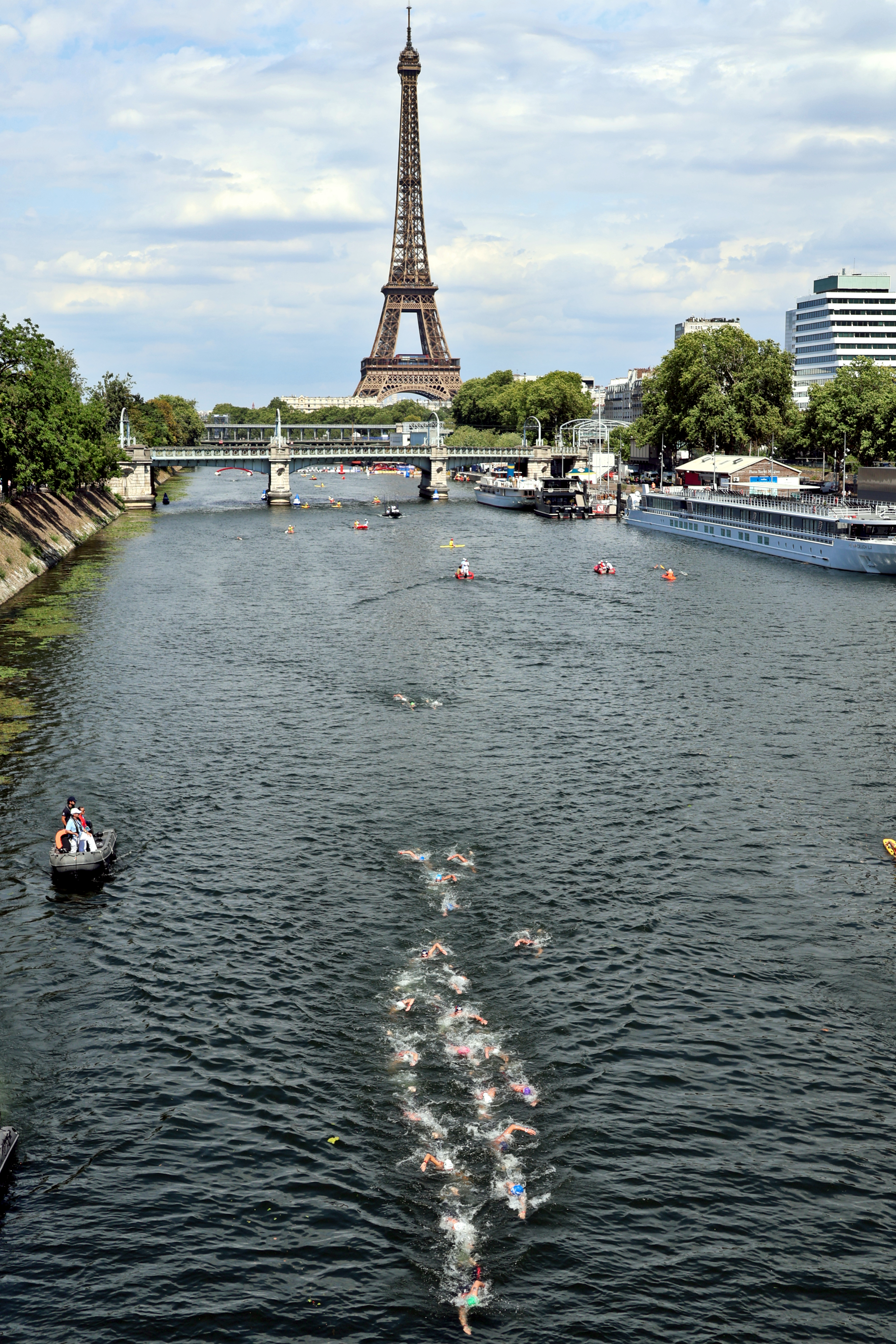
10 km

Event	Gold		Silver		Bronze	
3 km knockout sprint	Isabel Gose; Germany	6:41.09	Bettina Fábián; Hungary	6:44.19	Ginevra Taddeucci; Italy	6:44.86
5 km	Ginevra Taddeucci; Italy	1:02:31.29	Viktória Mihályvári-Farkas; Hungary	1:02:33.43	Barbara Pozzobon; Italy	1:02:35.19
10 km	Ginevra Taddeucci; Italy	2:07:49.90	Viktória Mihályvári-Farkas; Hungary	2:07:59.61	Linda Caponi; Italy	2:08:03.48

==== Mixed events ====
Event	Gold		Silver		Bronze	
Mixed 4 × 1500 metre relay	Germany; Julia Ackermann; Isabel Gose; Oliver Klemet; Florian Wellbrock	1:03:39.28	Italy; Barbara Pozzobon; Ginevra Taddeucci; Marcello Guidi; Gregorio Paltrinieri	1:03:41.34	Hungary; Bettina Fábián; Viktória Mihályvári-Farkas; Dávid Betlehem; Kristóf Rasovszky	1:03:42.44

=== Artistic swimming ===
==== Medal table ====
* Host nation (France)

Rank	Nation	Gold	Silver	Bronze	Total
1	Great Britain	4	0	1	5
2	Neutral Athletes B	3	1	3	7
3	Greece	2	0	0	2
4	Spain	1	5	2	8
5	Neutral Athletes A	1	1	0	2
6	Italy	0	3	4	7
7	Germany	0	1	1	2
Totals (7 entries)		11	11	11	33

==== Men ====
Event	Gold		Silver		Bronze	
Solo free routine	Ranjuo Tomblin; Great Britain	258.9188	Filippo Pelati; Italy	252.8713	Jordi Cáceres; Spain	229.2599
Solo technical routine	Ranjuo Tomblin; Great Britain	249.3951	Filippo Pelati; Italy	241.7008	Zakhar Trofimov; Neutral Athletes B	235.7858

==== Women ====
Event	Gold		Silver		Bronze	
Solo free routine	Vasilina Khandoshka; Neutral Athletes A	292.3887	Klara Bleyer; Germany	289.2463	Iris Tió; Spain	284.5550
Solo technical routine	Iris Tió; Spain	263.6250	Vasilina Khandoshka; Neutral Athletes A	263.3817	Klara Bleyer; Germany	258.0400
Duet free routine	Greece; Anna-Maria Alexandri; Eirini-Marina Alexandri	316.3315	Spain; Lilou Lluís; Iris Tió	315.6442	Neutral Athletes B Mayya Doroshko; Aleksandra Shmidt	310.4407
Duet technical routine	Greece; Anna-Maria Alexandri; Eirini-Marina Alexandri	311.4308	Neutral Athletes B Mayya Doroshko; Elizaveta Minaeva	302.9950	Great Britain; Kate Shortman; Isabelle Thorpe	297.9108

==== Mixed ====
Event	Gold		Silver		Bronze	
Duet free routine	Great Britain; Isabelle Thorpe; Ranjuo Tomblin	258.2383	Spain; Dennis González; Iris Tió	257.9733	Italy; Filippo Pelati; Lucrezia Ruggiero	255.1641
Duet technical routine	Great Britain; Isabelle Thorpe; Ranjuo Tomblin	229.6783	Italy; Filippo Pelati; Lucrezia Ruggiero	229.0092	Neutral Athletes B Alina Rumiantseva; Zakhar Trofimov	215.9201

==== Team ====
Event	Gold		Silver		Bronze	
Acrobatic routine	Neutral Athletes B Mayya Doroshko; Ekaterina Kossova; Elizaveta Minaeva; Valeriia Plekhanova; Elena Shabanova; Evelina Simonova; Elizaveta Smirnova; Olga Tiutiunik	244.8221	Spain; Cristina Arámbula; Meritxell Ferré; Marina García; Dennis González; Lilou Lluís; Paula Ramírez; Sara Saldaña; Iris Tió	242.2428	Italy; Beatrice Andina; Valentina Bisi; Marta Iacoacci; Alessia Macchi; Giorgia Macino; Sofia Mastroianni; Susanna Pedotti; Giulia Vernice	219.2545
Free routine	Neutral Athletes B Kira Cherezova; Mayya Doroshko; Ekaterina Kossova; Elizaveta Minaeva; Svetlana Pavlova; Elena Shabanova; Elizaveta Smirnova; Olga Tiutiunik	285.0346	Spain; Cristina Arámbula; Meritxell Ferré; Marina García; Mireia Hernández; Aurora Lázaro; Lilou Lluís; Alisa Ozhogina; Sara Saldaña	282.3541	Italy; Beatrice Andina; Valentina Bisi; Beatrice Esegio; Marta Iacoacci; Alessia Macchi; Sofia Mastroianni; Susanna Pedotti; Giulia Vernice	256.1558
Technical routine	Neutral Athletes B Kira Cherezova; Valentina Gerasimova; Ekaterina Kossova; Svetlana Pavlova; Elena Shabanova; Aleksandra Shmidt; Elizaveta Smirnova; Olga Tiutiunik	303.2467	Spain; Cristina Arámbula; Meritxell Ferré; Marina García; Mireia Hernández; Aurora Lázaro; Lilou Lluís; Sara Saldaña; Iris Tió	296.4299	Italy; Beatrice Andina; Valentina Bisi; Beatrice Esegio; Marta Iacoacci; Alessia Macchi; Sofia Mastroianni; Susanna Pedotti; Giulia Vernice	284.6725
