= Lena Hentschel =

German diver (born 2001)

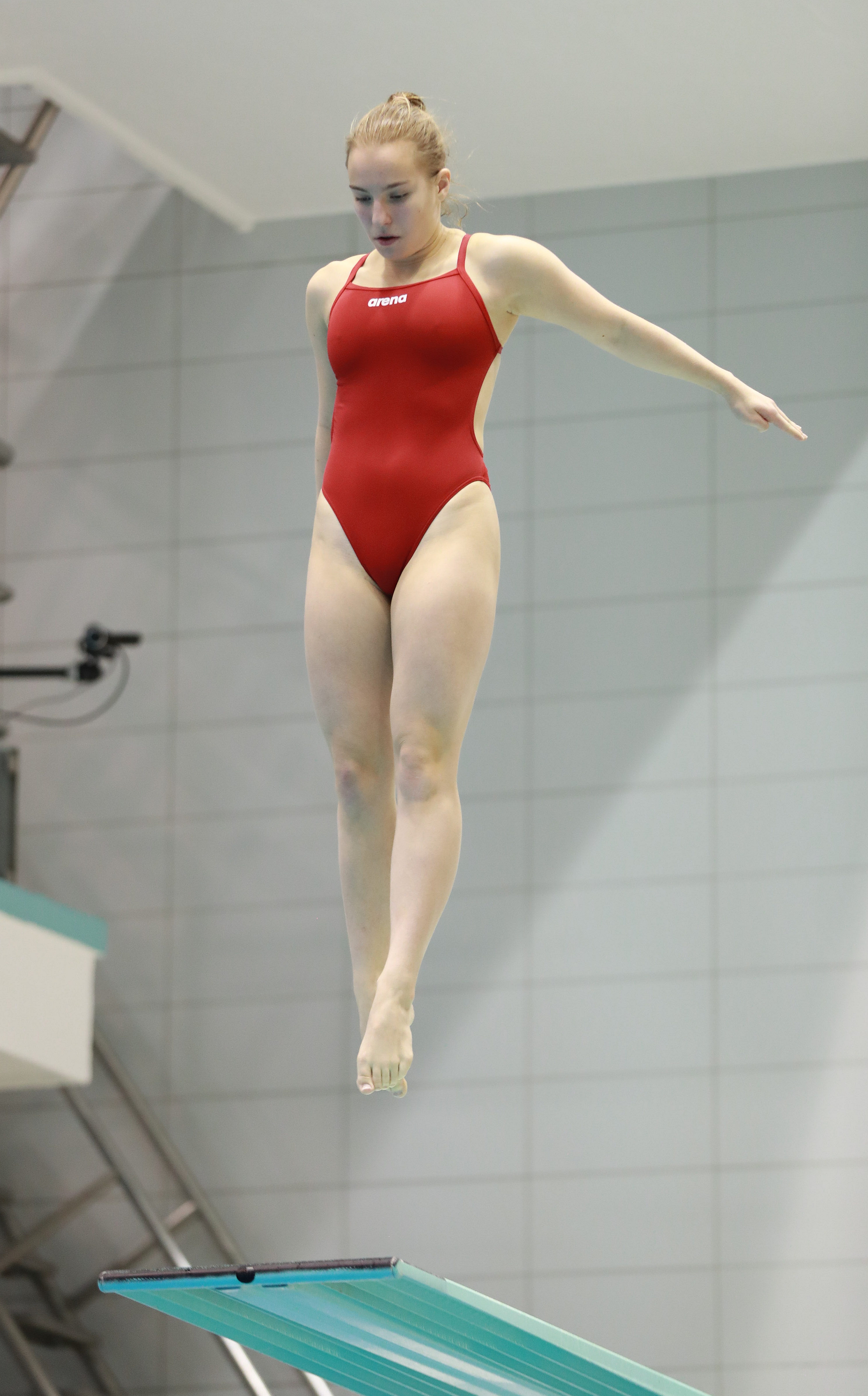
- Hentschel in 2018

Personal information
- Nationality: German
- Born: 17 June 2001 (age 25)
- Height: 1.57 m (5 ft 2 in)
- Weight: 52 kg (115 lb)

Sport
- Country: Germany
- Sport: Diving
- Event: 3 m synchro
- Club: Berliner TSC
Medal record
Olympic Games
Bronze medal – third place	2020 Tokyo	3 m synchro
World Championships
Bronze medal – third place	2023 Fukuoka	Team
European Games
Silver medal – second place	2023 Kraków-Małopolska	3 m synchro
European Aquatics Championships
Gold medal – first place	2020 Budapest	3 m synchro
Gold medal – first place	2022 Rome	3 m synchro
Silver medal – second place	2018 Glasgow	3 m synchro
Bronze medal – third place	2026 Paris	3 m mixed synchro
Bronze medal – third place	2026 Paris	3 m synchro
European Diving Championships
Gold medal – first place	2025 Antalya	3 m mixed synchro
Silver medal – second place	2019 Kyiv	3 m synchro
Silver medal – second place	2023 Rzeszów	3 m synchro
Silver medal – second place	2025 Antalya	3 m synchro
Silver medal – second place	2025 Antalya	Team
Bronze medal – third place	2025 Antalya	3 m springboard
World University Games
Gold medal – first place	2025 Rhine-Ruhr	3 m mixed synchro
Bronze medal – third place	2025 Rhine-Ruhr	3 m synchro

Lena Hentschel (born 17 June 2001) is a German diver.

== Career ==
She won a silver medal in the 3 m synchro springboard competition at the 2018 European Aquatics Championships.

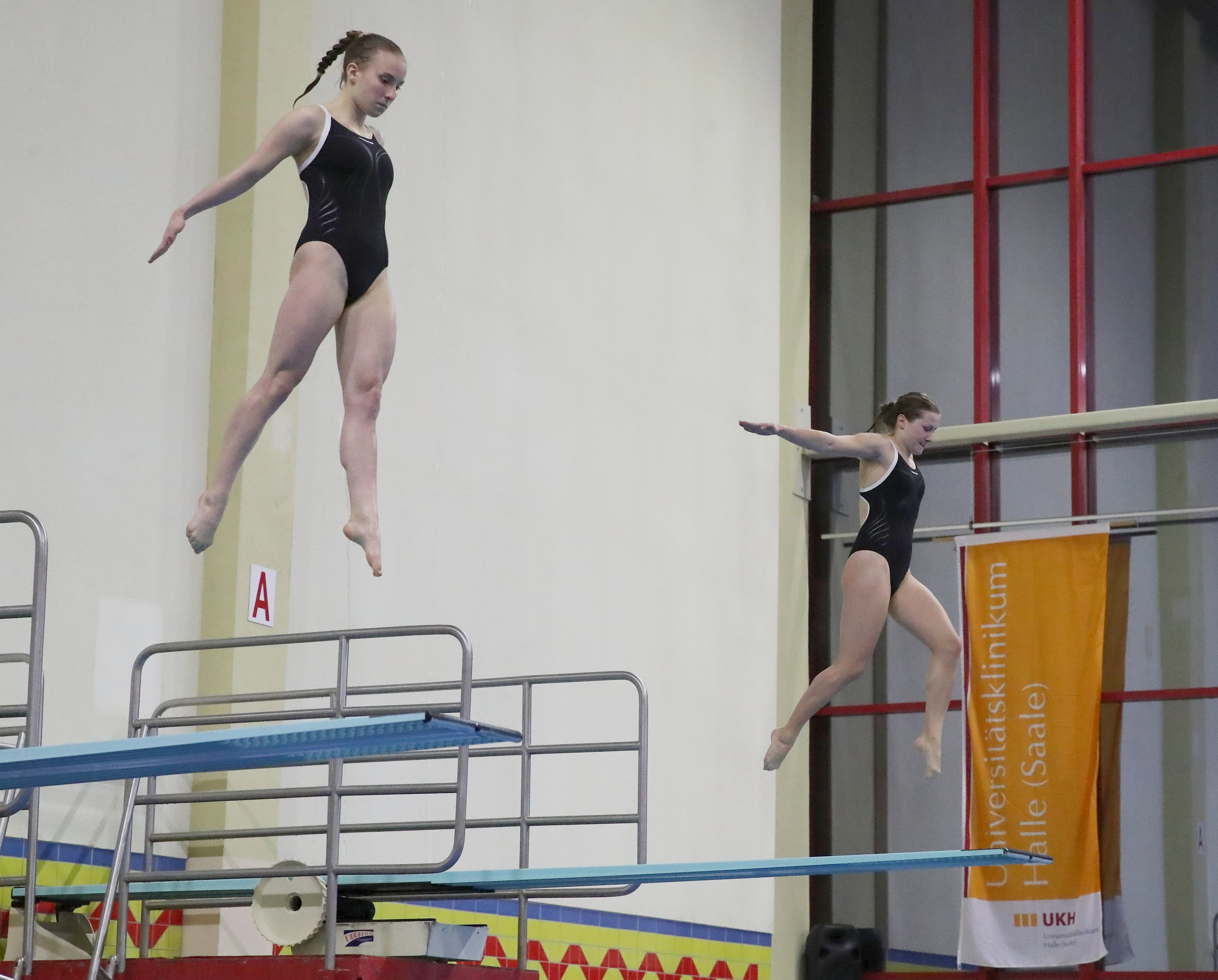
Hentschel (left) with Tina Punzel in 2020

She finished in 21st place in the preliminary round in the women's 1 metre springboard event at the 2019 World Aquatics Championships held in Gwangju, South Korea. In the women's 3 metre springboard event, she finished in 32nd place in the preliminary round.

She competed at the 2024 Summer Olympics where she came 6th in the 3 metre springboard event alongside Jette Müller.
