= Kaja Skrzek =

Polish diver (born 1998)

Personal information
- Nationality: Polish
- Born: 12 November 1998 (age 26)

Sport
- Sport: Diving

Kaja Skrzek (born 12 November 1998) is a Polish diver. She competed in the women's 1 metre springboard event at the 2019 World Aquatics Championships. She finished in 25th place in the preliminary round. In the women's 3 metre springboard event she finished in 37th place in the preliminary round.
