= Diving at the 2024 Summer Olympics – Men's synchronized 3 metre springboard =

Men's synchronized 3 metre springboard at the Games of the XXXIII Olympiad
- Venue: Paris Aquatics Centre
- Date: 2 August 2024
- Competitors: 16 from 8 nations
- Winning total: 446.10

Medalists
1st place, gold medalist(s)		Long Daoyi; Wang Zongyuan	China
2nd place, silver medalist(s)		Juan Celaya; Osmar Olvera	Mexico
3rd place, bronze medalist(s)		Anthony Harding; Jack Laugher	Great Britain

The men's 3 metre synchronised springboard diving competitions at the 2024 Summer Olympics in Paris took place on 2 August 2024 at the Paris Aquatics Centre. It was the 7th appearance of the event, which has been held at every Olympic Games since the 2000 Summer Olympics.

== Competition format ==
The competition was held in a single round, consisting of each pair performing six dives. Each dive was from a different group (forward, back, reverse, inward, and twisting). The first two dives were given a fixed degree of difficulty of 2.0, regardless of the dive performed. The other four dives were assigned a degree of difficulty based on somersaults, position, twists, approach, and entry. There was no limit to the degree of difficulty of dives; the most difficult dives calculated in the FINA rulebook (reverse 4 1/2 somersault in pike position and back 4 1/2 somersault in pike position) was 4.7, but competitors could attempt more difficult dives. Scoring was done by a panel of eleven judges, with five judges evaluating synchronization and three judges evaluating execution of each individual diver. For each dive, each judge gave a score between 0 and 10 with 0.5 point increments. The top and bottom synchronization scores and the top and bottom execution scores for each diver were discarded. The remaining five scores were summed, multiplied by 3/5, and multiplied by the degree of difficulty to give a dive score. The six dive scores were summed to give the score for the round.

== Schedule ==
All times are Central European time (UTC+1)

Date	Time	Round
2 August 2024	11:00	Final

== Qualification ==
The top 3 teams at the 2023 World Aquatics Championships earned a quota spot for their NOC. France as the host country, was guaranteed a quota spot. The next 4 teams at the 2024 World Aquatics Championships also received a quota spot.

The field was led by the defending Olympic and double World champion Wang Zongyuan with fellow World champion Long Daoyi of China, while former Olympic champion Jack Laugher of Great Britain returned with a third new partner in three Games, Anthony Harding.

== Results ==
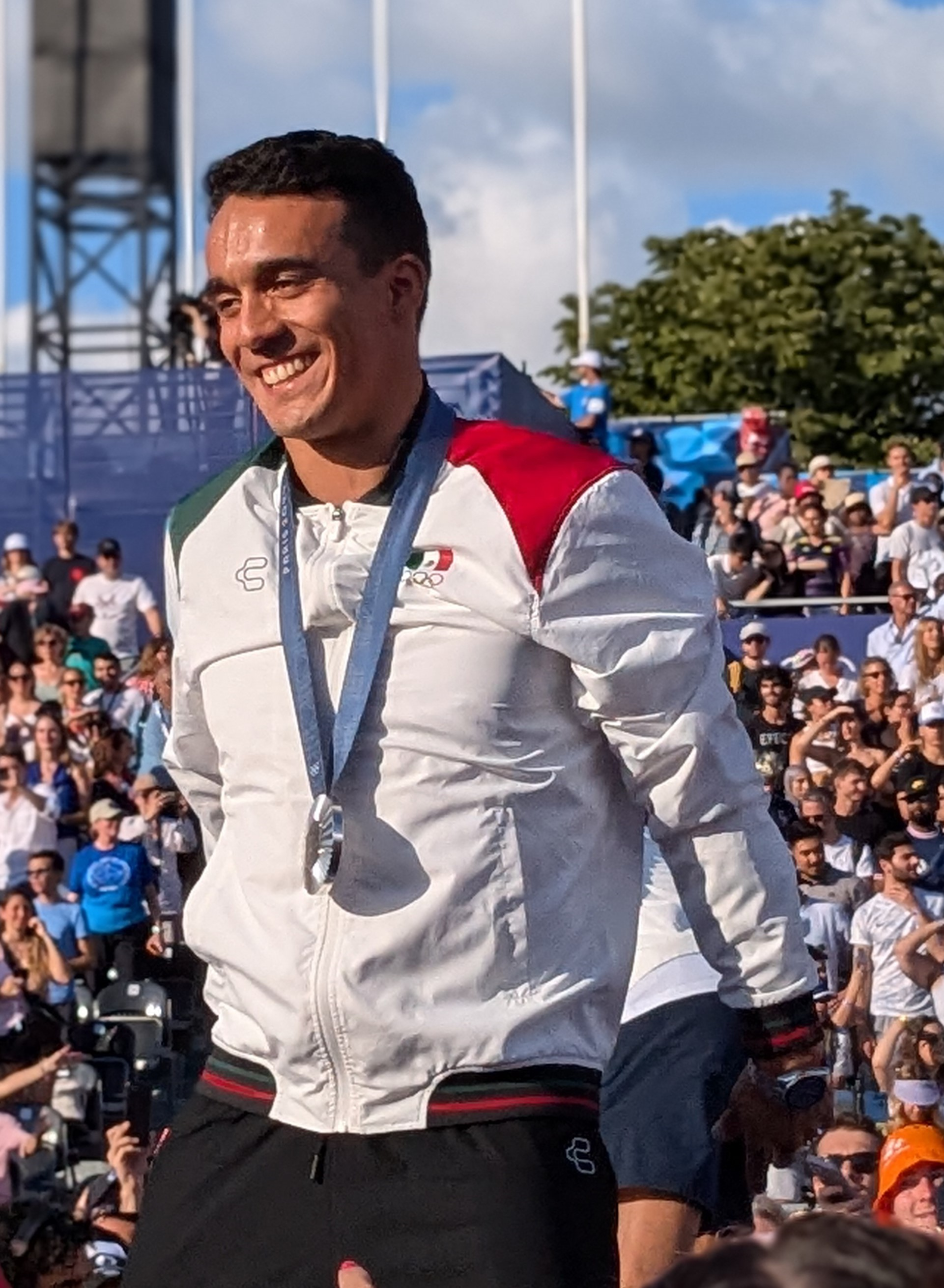
Juan Celaya celebrating his silver medal at the Champions Park.

Rank	Divers	Nation	Final						
Rank	Divers	Nation	Dive 1	Dive 2	Dive 3	Dive 4	Dive 5	Dive 6	Points
1st place, gold medalist(s)	Long Daoyi; Wang Zongyuan	China	54.60	52.80	79.56	77.70	85.68	95.76	446.10
2nd place, silver medalist(s)	Juan Celaya; Osmar Olvera	Mexico	49.80	46.80	82.62	85.69	84.36	94.77	444.03
3rd place, bronze medalist(s)	Anthony Harding; Jack Laugher	Great Britain	49.80	49.20	82.62	76.50	85.41	94.62	438.15
4	Lorenzo Marsaglia; Giovanni Tocci	Italy	50.40	48.00	73.47	82.62	74.46	74.10	403.05
5	Jules Bouyer; Alexis Jandard	France	47.40	47.40	69.36	60.42	77.52	67.20	369.30
6	Adrián Abadía; Nicolás García Boissier	Spain	47.40	45.00	64.80	69.75	72.45	62.22	361.62
7	Oleg Kolodiy; Danylo Konovalov	Ukraine	47.40	43.80	58.14	67.89	62.70	68.34	348.27
8	Tyler Downs; Greg Duncan	United States	49.80	48.60	37.74	72.42	64.05	73.47	346.08
