= Diving at the 2022 World Aquatics Championships – Men's synchronized 3 metre springboard =

Men's synchronized 3 metre springboard at the 2022 World Aquatics Championships
- Venue: Danube Arena
- Location: Budapest, Hungary
- Dates: 26 June (preliminary and final)
- Competitors: 32 from 16 nations
- Teams: 16
- Winning points: 459.18

Medalists
gold medal	Cao Yuan; Wang Zongyuan	China
silver medal	Anthony Harding; Jack Laugher	Great Britain
bronze medal	Timo Barthel; Lars Rüdiger	Germany

The Men's synchronized 3 metre springboard competition at the 2022 World Aquatics Championships was held on 26 June 2022.

== Results ==
The preliminary round was started at 09:00. The final was held at 16:00.

Green denotes finalists

Rank	Nation	Divers	Preliminary		Final	
Rank	Nation	Divers	Points	Rank	Points	Rank
1st place, gold medalist(s)	China	Cao Yuan; Wang Zongyuan	446.07	1	459.18	1
2nd place, silver medalist(s)	Great Britain	Anthony Harding; Jack Laugher	413.13	2	451.71	2
3rd place, bronze medalist(s)	Germany	Timo Barthel; Lars Rüdiger	383.07	5	406.44	3
4	Switzerland	Guillaume Dutoit; Jonathan Suckow	345.00	9	376.05	4
5	France	Jules Bouyer; Alexis Jandard	387.27	3	375.54	5
6	Italy	Lorenzo Marsaglia; Giovanni Tocci	361.65	6	372.33	6
7	Colombia	Sebastián Morales; Luis Uribe	386.37	4	364.62	7
8	Mexico	Diego García; Yolotl Martínez	358.26	7	363.21	8
9	Ukraine	Oleksandr Horshkovozov; Oleh Kolodiy	353.64	8	362.43	9
10	Spain	Adrián Abadía; Nicolás García	331.02	12	354.60	10
11	Malaysia	Chew Yiwei; Ooi Tze Liang	337.23	11	337.83	11
12	New Zealand	Liam Stone; Frazer Tavener	337.86	10	322.11	12
13	Dominican Republic	Frandiel Gómez; Jonathan Ruvalcaba	327.63	13		
14	Georgia	Sandro Melikidze; Tornike Onikashvili	316.95	14		
15	United States	Tyler Downs; Quentin Henninger	299.43	15		
16	Kuwait	Abdulrahman Abbas; Hasan Qali	287.10	16		
