= Diving at the 2022 European Aquatics Championships – Men's 3 m springboard =

Men's 3 m springboard at the 2022 European Aquatics Championships
- Venue: Foro Italico
- Dates: 20 August
- Competitors: 22 from 14 nations
- Winning points: 453.85

Medalists
gold medal	Lorenzo Marsaglia	Italy
silver medal	Jordan Houlden	Great Britain
bronze medal	Giovanni Tocci	Italy

The Men's 3 m springboard competition of the 2022 European Aquatics Championships was held on 20 August 2022.

== Results ==
The preliminary round was started at 10:00. The final round was held at 16:37.

Green denotes finalists

Rank	Diver	Nationality	Preliminary		Final	
Rank	Diver	Nationality	Points	Rank	Points	Rank
1st place, gold medalist(s)	Lorenzo Marsaglia	Italy	382.35	3	453.85	1
2nd place, silver medalist(s)	Jordan Houlden	Great Britain	364.00	6	428.55	2
3rd place, bronze medalist(s)	Giovanni Tocci	Italy	413.00	1	392.70	3
4	Guillaume Dutoit	Switzerland	367.75	5	382.75	4
5	Jack Laugher	Great Britain	392.30	2	375.70	5
6	Danylo Konovalov	Ukraine	351.45	7	368.30	6
7	Andrzej Rzeszutek	Poland	334.25	11	358.80	7
8	Adrián Abadía	Spain	342.35	9	352.10	8
9	Timo Barthel	Germany	340.70	10	350.80	9
10	Jonathan Suckow	Switzerland	380.50	4	349.25	10
11	David Ekdahl	Sweden	332.65	12	318.45	11
12	Alberto Arévalo	Spain	347.50	8	307.80	12
13	Athanasios Tsirikos	Greece	316.95	13	did not advance	
14	Jules Bouyer	France	315.35	14	did not advance	
15	Alexander Hart	Austria	313.20	15	did not advance	
16	Moritz Wesemann	Germany	309.25	16	did not advance	
17	Theofilos Afthinos	Greece	316.95	17	did not advance	
18	Kıvanç Gür	Turkey	284.45	18	did not advance	
19	Juho Junttila	Finland	273.90	19	did not advance	
20	Sandro Melikidze	Georgia	265.45	20	did not advance	
21	Tornike Onikashvili	Georgia	241.45	21	did not advance	
22	Jacob Stoltz	Sweden	193.05	22	did not advance	
