= Diving at the 2023 World Aquatics Championships – Men's synchronized 3 metre springboard =

Men's synchronized 3 metre springboard at the 2023 World Aquatics Championships
- Venue: Fukuoka Prefectural Pool
- Location: Fukuoka, Japan
- Dates: 15 July (preliminary and final)
- Competitors: 54 from 27 nations
- Teams: 27

Medalists
gold medal	Long Daoyi; Wang Zongyuan	China
silver medal	Anthony Harding; Jack Laugher	Great Britain
bronze medal	Jules Bouyer; Alexis Jandard	France

The men's synchronized 3 metre springboard competition at the 2023 World Aquatics Championships was held on 15 July 2023.

== Results ==
The preliminary round was started at 09:00. The final was held at 18:00.

Green denotes finalists

Rank	Nation	Divers	Preliminary		Final	
Rank	Nation	Divers	Points	Rank	Points	Rank
1st place, gold medalist(s)	China	Long Daoyi; Wang Zongyuan	451.44	1	456.33	1
2nd place, silver medalist(s)	Great Britain	Anthony Harding; Jack Laugher	383.46	3	424.62	2
3rd place, bronze medalist(s)	France	Jules Bouyer; Alexis Jandard	344.85	11	389.10	3
4	United States	Tyler Downs; Greg Duncan	362.94	7	385.23	4
5	Spain	Adrián Abadía; Nicolás García	370.62	6	383.61	5
6	Italy	Lorenzo Marsaglia; Giovanni Tocci	384.69	2	380.97	6
7	Japan	Yuto Araki; Haruki Suyama	359.04	8	375.90	7
8	Switzerland	Jonathan Suckow; Guillaume Dutoit	342.69	12	372.33	8
9	Poland	Kacper Lesiak; Andrzej Rzeszutek	349.29	9	370.50	9
10	Germany	Timo Barthel; Lars Rüdiger	383.04	4	370.26	10
11	Mexico	Juan Celaya; Rodrigo Diego	382.08	5	369.75	11
12	Australia	Sam Fricker; Li Shixin	348.06	10	356.49	12
13	Austria	Alexander Hart; Nikolaj Schaller	341.16	13	Did not advance	
14	Jamaica	Yohan Eskrick-Parkinson; Yona Knight-Wisdom	339.18	14	Did not advance	
15	Croatia	David Ledinski; Matej Neveščanin	335.73	15	Did not advance	
16	Dominican Republic	Frandiel Gómez; Jonathan Ruvalcaba	335.31	16	Did not advance	
17	Colombia	Daniel Restrepo; Luis Uribe	334.32	17	Did not advance	
18	South Korea	Woo Ha-ram; Yi Jae-gyeong	331.62	18	Did not advance	
19	Malaysia	Ooi Tze Liang; Muhammad Syafiq Puteh	326.73	19	Did not advance	
20	New Zealand	Liam Stone; Frazer Tavener	325.32	20	Did not advance	
21	Ukraine	Oleh Kolodiy; Danylo Konovalov	325.23	21	Did not advance	
22	Brazil	Rafael Fogaça; Rafael Max	301.68	22	Did not advance	
23	Indonesia	Tri Anggoro Priambodo; Adityo Restu Putra	281.01	23	Did not advance	
24	Greece	Theofilos Afthinos; Nikolaos Molvalis	262.95	24	Did not advance	
25	Georgia	Sandro Melikidze; Tornike Onikashvili	251.34	25	Did not advance	
26	Hong Kong	Robben Yiu; Curtis Yuen	229.89	26	Did not advance	
27	Macau	He Heung Wing; Zhang Hoi	200.04	27	Did not advance	

== Paris 2024 Olympic qualification ==
The 3 metre synchronised springboard event was a direct qualification event for the diving program at the 2024 Olympic Games. The top three teams are awarded quota places for the 3 metre synchronised springboard event. As bronze medalists France, as host, automatically receive a quota in the event, fourth placed United States are awarded the third quota berth from this event.

Qualification event	Qualified NOCs
Men's synchronized 3 metre springboard	China
Men's synchronized 3 metre springboard	Great Britain
Men's synchronized 3 metre springboard	United States
Total	3 Quotas (6 Divers)
