= Diving at the 2019 World Aquatics Championships – Men's 3 metre springboard =

Men's 3 metre springboard at the 2019 World Aquatics Championships
- Venue: Nambu University Municipal Aquatics Center
- Location: Gwangju, South Korea
- Dates: 17–18 July
- Competitors: 57 from 33 nations
- Winning points: 545.45

Medalists
gold medal	Xie Siyi	China
silver medal	Cao Yuan	China
bronze medal	Jack Laugher	Great Britain

The Men's 3 metre springboard competition at the 2019 World Aquatics Championships was held on 17 and 18 July 2019.

== Results ==
The preliminary round was started on 17 July at 10:00. The semifinal was held on 17 July at 15:30. The final was held on 18 July at 20:45.

Green denotes finalists

Blue denotes semifinalists

Rank	Diver	Nationality	Preliminary		Semifinal		Final	
Rank	Diver	Nationality	Points	Rank	Points	Rank	Points	Rank
1st place, gold medalist(s)	Xie Siyi	China	499.15	1	522.60	1	545.45	1
2nd place, silver medalist(s)	Cao Yuan	China	451.35	4	469.30	2	517.85	2
3rd place, bronze medalist(s)	Jack Laugher	Great Britain	485.50	2	468.45	3	504.55	3
4	Woo Ha-ram	South Korea	457.70	3	430.65	11	478.80	4
5	David Boudia	United States	424.45	7	464.20	4	458.10	5
6	Patrick Hausding	Germany	418.25	9	446.20	9	452.25	6
7	Mike Hixon	United States	423.05	8	428.00	12	449.95	7
8	Rommel Pacheco	Mexico	427.30	6	451.55	6	443.30	8
9	Nikita Shleikher	Russia	436.30	5	452.15	5	442.95	9
10	Evgeny Kuznetsov	Russia	416.10	12	447.55	8	434.55	10
11	Sebastián Morales	Colombia	399.50	17	448.45	7	433.50	11
12	Oleh Kolodiy	Ukraine	402.75	16	438.60	10	421.40	12
13	Matthew Carter	Australia	416.35	11	420.00	13	Did not advance	
14	Daniel Restrepo	Colombia	404.95	15	413.95	14	Did not advance	
15	Martin Wolfram	Germany	408.55	14	403.50	15	Did not advance	
16	Francois Imbeau-Dulac	Canada	409.30	13	395.20	16	Did not advance	
17	Rafael Quintero	Puerto Rico	396.70	18	376.45	17	Did not advance	
18	Oliver Dingley	Ireland	417.95	10	358.95	18	Did not advance	
19	Ken Terauchi	Japan	395.80	19	Did not advance			
20	Yona Knight-Wisdom	Jamaica	390.20	20	Did not advance			
21	Kacper Lesiak	Poland	389.90	21	Did not advance			
22	Guillaume Dutoit	Switzerland	383.45	22	Did not advance			
23	Lorenzo Marsaglia	Italy	379.00	23	Did not advance			
24	Li Shixin	Australia	377.75	24	Did not advance			
25	Ooi Tze Liang	Malaysia	376.95	25	Did not advance			
26	Alexis Jandard	France	376.90	26	Did not advance			
27	Mohab Ishak	Egypt	376.75	27	Did not advance			
28	Sho Sakai	Japan	375.00	28	Did not advance			
29	Philippe Gagné	Canada	370.40	29	Did not advance			
30	Giovanni Tocci	Italy	363.20	30	Did not advance			
31	Jonathan Suckow	Switzerland	362.65	31	Did not advance			
32	Adrián Abadía	Spain	360.35	32	Did not advance			
33	Kim Yeong-taek	South Korea	356.65	33	Did not advance			
34	Laydel Domínguez	Cuba	352.00	34	Did not advance			
35	Yury Naurozau	Belarus	348.65	35	Did not advance			
36	Nicolás García	Spain	348.35	36	Did not advance			
37	Stanislav Oliferchyk	Ukraine	346.30	37	Did not advance			
38	Andrzej Rzeszutek	Poland	344.20	38	Did not advance			
39	Gwendal Bisch	France	341.45	39	Did not advance			
40	Mark Lee	Singapore	339.85	40	Did not advance			
41	Chew Yiwei	Malaysia	332.65	41	Did not advance			
42	Liam Stone	New Zealand	332.15	42	Did not advance			
43	Angello Alcebo	Cuba	327.80	43	Did not advance			
44	Juraj Melša	Croatia	326.30	44	Did not advance			
45	Diego Carquin	Chile	317.70	45	Did not advance			
46	James Heatly	Great Britain	315.40	46	Did not advance			
47	Youssef Ezzat	Egypt	308.65	47	Did not advance			
48	Anton Down-Jenkins	New Zealand	307.30	48	Did not advance			
49	Donato Neglia	Chile	299.50	49	Did not advance			
50	Alejandro Islas	Mexico	295.90	50	Did not advance			
51	Luis Moura	Brazil	287.95	51	Did not advance			
52	Kawan Pereira	Brazil	275.90	52	Did not advance			
53	Sandro Melikidze	Georgia	269.00	53	Did not advance			
54	Abdulrahman Abbas	Kuwait	253.45	54	Did not advance			
55	Davron Botirov	Uzbekistan	251.45	55	Did not advance			
56	Rungsiman Yanmongkon	Thailand	218.50	56	Did not advance			
57	Rashid Al-Harbi	Kuwait	181.80	57	Did not advance			
