= Diving at the 2024 Summer Olympics – Men's 3 metre springboard =

Men's 3 metre springboard at the Games of the XXXIII Olympiad
- Venue: Paris Aquatics Centre
- Date: 6 August 2024 (Preliminary); 7 August 2024 (semifinals); 8 August 2024 (Final)
- Competitors: 25 from 15 nations

Medalists
| 1st place, gold medalist(s) | | Xie Siyi | China |
| 2nd place, silver medalist(s) | | Wang Zongyuan | China |
| 3rd place, bronze medalist(s) | | Osmar Olvera | Mexico |

The men's 3 metre springboard diving competition at the 2024 Summer Olympics in Paris was held at the Paris Aquatics Centre. It was the 27th appearance of the event, which has been held at every Olympic Games since the 1908 Summer Olympics.

== Competition format ==
The competition was held in three rounds

- Preliminary round: All divers performed six dives; the top 18 divers advanced to the semi-final.
- Semi-final: The scores of the preliminary round were erased. The 18 remaining divers performed six dives each, and the top 12 divers advanced to the final.
- Final: The semi-final scores were erased. The 12 final divers performed six dives each, and the top three divers won the gold, silver and bronze medals respectively.

Within each round of six dives, at least one dive must have been from each of the five groups (forward, back, reverse, inward, and twisting). The sixth dive may have been from any group, but may not have repeated one of the other dives. Each dive was assigned a degree of difficulty based on somersaults, position, twists, approach, and entry. There was no limit to the degree of difficulty of dives; the most difficult dives calculated in the FINA rulebook (reverse 4 1/2 somersault in pike position and back 4 1/2 somersault in pike position) are 4.7, but competitors could attempt more difficult dives. Scoring was done by a panel of seven judges. For each dive, each judge gave a score between 0 and 10 with 0.5 point increments. The top two and bottom two scores were discarded. The remaining three scores were summed and multiplied by the degree of difficulty to give a dive score. The six dive scores were summed to give the score for the round.

== Schedule ==
All times are Central European Time (UTC+1)

| Date | Time | Round |
|---|---|---|
| 6 August 2024 | 10:00 | Preliminary |
| 7 August 2024 | 10:00 | Semifinal |
| 8 August 2024 | 15:00 | Final |

== Qualification ==
The qualification spots for the Men's 3 metre springboard diving event were attributed as follows:

- 2023 World Championships – The top twelve finalists of each individual event obtained a quota place for their NOC at the 2023 World Aquatics Championships, scheduled for July 14 to 30, in Fukuoka, Japan.
- Continental Qualification Tournaments – The winners of each individual event obtained a quota place for their NOC at one of the five continental meets (Africa, the Americas, Asia, Europe, and Oceania) approved by World Aquatics.
- 2024 World Championships – Twelve highest-ranked divers eligible for qualification obtained a quota place for their NOC in each individual event at the 2024 FINA World Championships, scheduled for February 2 to 18, in Doha, Qatar, respecting the two-member country limit and without surpassing the total quota of 136.
- Reallocation – Additional spots were allocated to the eligible divers placed thirteenth and above in their corresponding individual events, respecting the two-member country limit, at the 2024 World Aquatics Championships until they attain the total quota of 136.
- Host nation – As the host country, France reserves four men's spots to be distributed across the individual diving events.

== Results ==
25 divers entered the event, representing 15 nations.

| Rank | Name | Nation | Preliminary | | Semi final | | Final | | | | | | |
| Rank | Name | Nation | Score | Rank | Score | Rank | Dive 1 | Dive 2 | Dive 3 | Dive 4 | Dive 5 | Dive 6 | Total |
|---|---|---|---|---|---|---|---|---|---|---|---|---|---|
| 1st place, gold medalist(s) | Xie Siyi | China | 509.60 | 2 | 505.85 | 2 | 86.70 | 79.20 | 97.20 | 91.00 | 88.80 | 100.70 | 543.60 |
| 2nd place, silver medalist(s) | Wang Zongyuan | China | 530.65 | 1 | 537.85 | 1 | 81.60 | 91.00 | 95.55 | 89.25 | 70.20 | 102.60 | 530.20 |
| 3rd place, bronze medalist(s) | Osmar Olvera | Mexico | 444.15 | 5 | 463.75 | 4 | 79.90 | 89.25 | 63.00 | 75.85 | 98.80 | 93.60 | 500.40 |
| 4 | Carson Tyler | United States | 389.80 | 10 | 438.00 | 7 | 76.50 | 67.50 | 69.75 | 72.00 | 64.75 | 78.75 | 429.25 |
| 5 | Jordan Houlden | Great Britain | 448.20 | 4 | 445.55 | 5 | 76.50 | 64.60 | 68.25 | 74.10 | 70.20 | 74.10 | 427.75 |
| 6 | Luis Uribe | Colombia | 375.90 | 17 | 423.80 | 10 | 49.30 | 71.40 | 79.95 | 72.20 | 72.00 | 77.00 | 421.85 |
| 7 | Jack Laugher | Great Britain | 468.30 | 3 | 467.05 | 3 | 74.80 | 84.00 | 35.70 | 72.15 | 74.10 | 70.20 | 410.95 |
| 8 | Jules Bouyer | France | 407.30 | 6 | 438.30 | 6 | 73.10 | 81.60 | 67.50 | 68.25 | 57.75 | 47.50 | 395.70 |
| 9 | Jonathan Ruvalcaba | Dominican Republic | 363.15 | 18 | 416.20 | 12 | 76.50 | 44.20 | 62.70 | 61.50 | 75.25 | 73.50 | 393.65 |
| 10 | Kurtis Mathews | Australia | 399.20 | 8 | 417.15 | 11 | 65.10 | 76.50 | 52.50 | 64.80 | 56.10 | 68.40 | 383.40 |
| 11 | Woo Ha-ram | South Korea | 389.10 | 12 | 432.00 | 9 | 71.40 | 68.00 | 45.60 | 73.50 | 63.00 | 52.65 | 374.15 |
| 12 | Moritz Wesemann | Germany | 398.70 | 9 | 433.00 | 8 | 74.80 | 78.20 | 40.25 | 43.20 | 57.00 | 70.20 | 363.65 |
| 13 | Yona Knight-Wisdom | Jamaica | 382.90 | 14 | 412.40 | 13 | Did not advance | | | | | | |
| 14 | Sho Sakai | Japan | 389.15 | 11 | 410.15 | 14 | Did not advance | | | | | | |
| 15 | Andrew Capobianco | United States | 382.05 | 15 | 407.65 | 15 | Did not advance | | | | | | |
| 16 | Gwendal Bisch | France | 387.00 | 13 | 392.70 | 16 | Did not advance | | | | | | |
| 17 | Yi Jae-gyeong | South Korea | 381.40 | 16 | 366.50 | 17 | Did not advance | | | | | | |
| 18 | Lorenzo Marsaglia | Italy | 405.05 | 7 | 354.05 | 18 | Did not advance | | | | | | |
| 19 | Kevin Muñoz | Mexico | 362.05 | 19 | Did not advance | | | | | | | | |
| 20 | Daniel Restrepo | Colombia | 361.10 | 20 | Did not advance | | | | | | | | |
| 21 | Jake Passmore | Ireland | 360.90 | 21 | Did not advance | | | | | | | | |
| 22 | Giovanni Tocci | Italy | 346.85 | 22 | Did not advance | | | | | | | | |
| 23 | Mohamed Farouk | Egypt | 317.40 | 23 | Did not advance | | | | | | | | |
| 24 | Frandiel Gómez | Dominican Republic | 317.40 | 23 | Did not advance | | | | | | | | |
| 25 | Lars Rüdiger | Germany | 301.15 | 25 | Did not advance | | | | | | | | |
