= Diving at the 2018 European Aquatics Championships – Men's 1 m springboard =

Men's 1 m springboard at the 2018 European Aquatics Championships
- Venue: Royal Commonwealth Pool
- Dates: 7 August
- Competitors: 27 from 16 nations
- Winning points: 414.60

Medalists
gold medal	Jack Laugher	Great Britain
silver medal	Giovanni Tocci	Italy
bronze medal	James Heatly	Great Britain

The freestyle competition of the 2018 European Aquatics Championships was held on 7 August 2018.

== Results ==
The preliminary round was started at 09:30. The final was held at 14:40.

Green denotes finalists

Rank	Diver	Nationality	Preliminary		Final	
Rank	Diver	Nationality	Points	Rank	Points	Rank
1st place, gold medalist(s)	Jack Laugher	Great Britain	397.80	1	414.60	1
2nd place, silver medalist(s)	Giovanni Tocci	Italy	353.85	4	401.10	2
3rd place, bronze medalist(s)	James Heatly	Great Britain	346.75	6	391.70	3
4	Guillaume Dutoit	Switzerland	355.25	3	390.50	4
5	Oliver Dingley	Ireland	332.70	11	385.65	5
6	Lorenzo Marsaglia	Italy	351.25	5	375.45	6
7	Jonathan Suckow	Switzerland	357.20	2	354.30	7
8	Andrzej Rzeszutek	Poland	330.80	12	350.65	8
9	Nicolás García	Spain	335.40	10	349.30	9
10	Nikita Shleikher	Russia	341.90	7	349.15	10
11	Alexis Jandard	France	336.55	9	332.40	11
12	Vinko Paradzik	Sweden	336.90	8	293.25	12
13	Lars Rüdiger	Germany	328.20	13	did not advance	
14	Patrick Hausding	Germany	316.65	14	did not advance	
15	Alberto Arévalo	Spain	314.00	15	did not advance	
16	Yury Naurozau	Belarus	293.10	16	did not advance	
17	Dylan Vork	Netherlands	286.60	17	did not advance	
18	Oleh Kolodiy	Ukraine	286.40	18	did not advance	
19	Egor Lapin	Russia	285.70	19	did not advance	
20	Stanislav Oliferchyk	Ukraine	281.95	20	did not advance	
21	Damien Cely	France	280.50	21	did not advance	
22	Alexandr Molchan	Belarus	279.70	22	did not advance	
23	Alexander Kostov	Bulgaria	278.75	23	did not advance	
24	Johannes van Etten	Netherlands	271.50	24	did not advance	
25	Juho Junttila	Finland	249.50	25	did not advance	
26	Jack Ffrench	Ireland	224.90	26	did not advance	
27	Nikolaj Schaller	Austria	222.30	27	did not advance	
