= Diving at the 2020 European Aquatics Championships – Men's 1 m springboard =

Men's 1 m springboard at the 2020 European Aquatics Championships
- Venue: Danube Arena
- Dates: 12 May 2021
- Competitors: 32 from 19 nations
- Winning points: 427.75

Medalists
gold medal	Patrick Hausding	Germany
silver medal	Jack Laugher	Great Britain
bronze medal	Giovanni Tocci	Italy

The Men's 1 m springboard competition of the 2020 European Aquatics Championships was held on 12 May 2021.

== Results ==
The preliminary round was started at 12:00. The final was held at 20:40.

Green denotes finalists

Rank	Diver	Nationality	Preliminary		Final	
Rank	Diver	Nationality	Points	Rank	Points	Rank
1st place, gold medalist(s)	Patrick Hausding	Germany	381.95	2	427.75	1
2nd place, silver medalist(s)	Jack Laugher	Great Britain	399.45	1	402.90	2
3rd place, bronze medalist(s)	Giovanni Tocci	Italy	368.05	3	402.50	3
4	Lorenzo Marsaglia	Italy	367.35	4	371.05	4
5	Ilia Molchanov	Russia	344.30	7	370.55	5
6	Alexis Jandard	France	361.80	5	365.75	6
7	Nicolás García	Spain	323.85	12	363.10	7
8	Guillaume Dutoit	Switzerland	338.65	9	352.50	8
9	Timo Barthel	Germany	343.95	8	349.90	9
10	Andrzej Rzeszutek	Poland	331.95	10	346.45	10
11	Oleh Kolodiy	Ukraine	348.60	6	342.75	11
12	Vinko Paradzik	Sweden	331.90	11	312.55	12
13	Victor Povzner	Russia	323.20	13	did not advance	
14	Kacper Lesiak	Poland	309.60	14	did not advance	
15	Jules Bouyer	France	308.55	15	did not advance	
16	Alberto Arévalo	Spain	306.90	16	did not advance	
17	Ross Haslam	Great Britain	299.25	17	did not advance	
18	Pascal Faatz	Netherlands	297.80	18	did not advance	
19	Nikolaj Schaller	Austria	295.80	19	did not advance	
20	Juho Junttila	Finland	284.95	20	did not advance	
21	Bram Meulendijks	Netherlands	282.65	21	did not advance	
22	Dariush Lotfi	Austria	281.40	22	did not advance	
23	Illia Trushyn	Ukraine	276.10	23	did not advance	
24	Botond Bóta	Hungary	272.50	24	did not advance	
25	Axel Nyborg	Norway	261.65	25	did not advance	
26	Yury Naurozau	Belarus	260.80	26	did not advance	
27	Uladzislau Sonin	Belarus	257.00	27	did not advance	
28	Max Burman	Sweden	255.70	28	did not advance	
29	Tornike Onikashvili	Georgia	253.05	29	did not advance	
30	Theofilos Afthinos	Greece	221.20	30	did not advance	
31	Kıvanç Gür	Turkey	213.35	31	did not advance	
32	Orhan Candan	Turkey	210.70	32	did not advance	
