= Diving at the 2018 European Aquatics Championships – Men's 3 m springboard =

2018 European Aquatics Championships Men's 3m Springboard results

Men's 3 m Springboard at the 2018 European Aquatics Championships
- Venue: Royal Commonwealth Pool
- Dates: 9 August
- Competitors: 30 from 18 nations
- Winning points: 525.95

Medalists
gold medal	Jack Laugher	Great Britain
silver medal	Ilia Zakharov	Russia
bronze medal	Evgeny Kuznetsov	Russia

The Men's 3 m Springboard competition of the 2018 European Aquatics Championships was held on 9 August 2018.

== Results ==
The preliminary round was started at 09:30. The final was held at 15:00.

Green denotes finalists

Rank	Diver	Nationality	Preliminary		Final	
Rank	Diver	Nationality	Points	Rank	Points	Rank
1st place, gold medalist(s)	Jack Laugher	Great Britain	467.55	2	525.95	1
2nd place, silver medalist(s)	Ilia Zakharov	Russia	508.10	1	519.05	2
3rd place, bronze medalist(s)	Evgeny Kuznetsov	Russia	406.70	4	508.05	3
4	Daniel Goodfellow	Great Britain	415.70	3	437.75	4
5	Patrick Hausding	Germany	371.00	7	421.10	5
6	Lorenzo Marsaglia	Italy	350.60	10	409.70	6
7	Guillaume Dutoit	Switzerland	384.30	5	400.50	7
8	Andrzej Rzeszutek	Poland	329.35	12	387.40	8
9	Nicolás García	Spain	379.15	6	370.25	9
10	Alexis Jandard	France	335.95	11	369.65	10
11	Yury Naurozau	Belarus	366.80	8	362.55	11
12	Oliver Homuth	Germany	355.25	9	357.70	12
13	Oleh Kolodiy	Ukraine	325.25	13		
14	Kacper Lesiak	Poland	313.70	14		
15	Damien Cely	France	309.00	15		
16	Athanasios Tsirikos	Greece	306.60	16		
17	Alberto Arévalo	Spain	305.90	17		
18	Alexander Kostov	Bulgaria	304.05	18		
19	Jonathan Suckow	Switzerland	303.95	19		
20	Giovanni Tocci	Italy	303.90	20		
21	Juho Junttila	Finland	298.65	21		
22	Johannes van Etten	Netherlands	297.75	22		
23	Dylan Vork	Netherlands	279.05	23		
24	Alexandr Molchan	Belarus	271.60	24		
25	Nikolaj Schaller	Austria	266.05	25		
26	Stanislav Oliferchyk	Ukraine	250.90	26		
27	Tornike Onikashvili	Georgia	224.85	27		
28	Sandro Melikidze	Georgia	197.35	28		
