= Diving at the 2022 European Aquatics Championships – Men's 1 m springboard =

Men's 1 m springboard at the 2022 European Aquatics Championships
- Venue: Foro Italico
- Dates: 18 August
- Competitors: 24 from 14 nations
- Winning points: 413.40

Medalists
gold medal	Jack Laugher	Great Britain
silver medal	Lorenzo Marsaglia	Italy
bronze medal	Giovanni Tocci	Italy

The Men's 1 m springboard competition of the 2022 European Aquatics Championships was held on 18 August 2022.

== Results ==
The preliminary round was started at 10:00. The final was held at 16:40.

Green denotes finalists

Rank	Diver	Nationality	Preliminary		Final	
Rank	Diver	Nationality	Points	Rank	Points	Rank
1st place, gold medalist(s)	Jack Laugher	Great Britain	365.30	2	413.40	1
2nd place, silver medalist(s)	Lorenzo Marsaglia	Italy	370.55	1	396.25	2
3rd place, bronze medalist(s)	Giovanni Tocci	Italy	355.75	4	386.20	3
4	Moritz Wesemann	Germany	328.90	7	379.00	4
5	Jordan Houlden	Great Britain	337.95	5	372.05	5
6	Jules Bouyer	France	337.65	6	365.60	6
7	Stanislav Oliferchyk	Ukraine	327.85	8	343.20	7
8	Timo Barthel	Germany	363.00	3	340.70	8
9	Guillaume Dutoit	Switzerland	326.90	9	338.60	9
10	Danylo Konovalov	Ukraine	314.80	12	332.80	10
111	Alberto Arévalo	Spain	323.40	10	305.05	11
12	Gwendal Bisch	France	317.35	11	295.95	12
13	Elias Petersen	Sweden	309.80	13	Did not advance	
14	Theofilos Afthinos	Greece	301.60	14	Did not advance	
15	Dariush Lotfi	Austria	300.30	15	Did not advance	
16	Jonathan Suckow	Switzerland	298.20	16	Did not advance	
17	Andrzej Rzeszutek	Poland	297.35	17	Did not advance	
18	David Ekdahl	Sweden	279.85	18	Did not advance	
19	Tornike Onikashvili	Georgia	276.15	19	Did not advance	
20	Dimitar Isaev	Bulgaria	250.75	20	Did not advance	
21	Robert Łukaszewicz	Poland	226.65	21	Did not advance	
22	Alexander Hart	Austria	223.85	22	Did not advance	
23	Juho Junttila	Finland	211.00	23	Did not advance	
	Irakli Sakandelidze	Georgia	Did not finish		Did not advance	
