= 2023 European Diving Championships – Men's synchronized 3 metre springboard =

Men's synchronized 3 metre springboard at the 2023 European Diving Championships
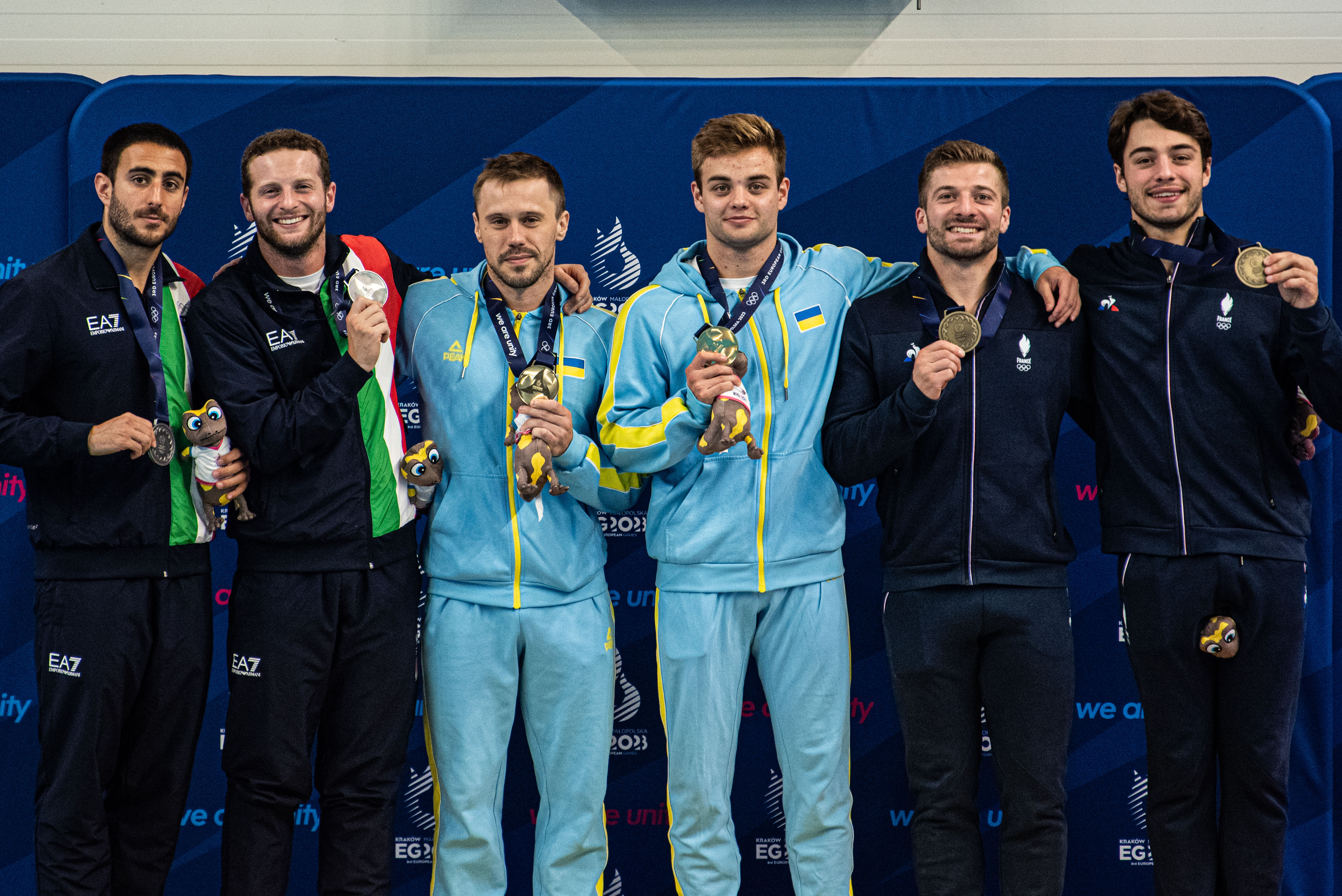
- Venue: Rzeszów Diving Arena
- Date: 28 June
- Competitors: 24 from 12 nations
- Teams: 12
- Winning points: 410.16

Medalists
| gold medal | Oleh Kolodiy; Danylo Konovalov | Ukraine |
| silver medal | Lorenzo Marsaglia; Giovanni Tocci | Italy |
| bronze medal | Jules Bouyer; Alexis Jandard | France |

The men's synchronized 3 metre springboard event at the 2023 European Diving Championships was held on 28 June 2023.

== Results ==
The final was held at 18:00.

| Rank | Nation | Divers | D1 | D2 | D3 | D4 | D5 | D6 | Total |
|---|---|---|---|---|---|---|---|---|---|
| 1st place, gold medalist(s) | Ukraine | Oleh Kolodiy; Danylo Konovalov | 48.00 | 49.20 | 71.40 | 82.08 | 84.00 | 75.48 | 410.16 |
| 2nd place, silver medalist(s) | Italy | Lorenzo Marsaglia; Giovanni Tocci | 51.60 | 47.40 | 72.54 | 73.44 | 74.46 | 83.22 | 402.66 |
| 3rd place, bronze medalist(s) | France | Jules Bouyer; Alexis Jandard | 45.60 | 49.80 | 69.36 | 69.75 | 79.56 | 80.85 | 394.92 |
| 4 | Great Britain | Ross Haslam; James Heatly | 49.80 | 47.40 | 75.60 | 74.46 | 76.65 | 69.54 | 393.45 |
| 5 | Spain | Adrián Abadía; Nicolás García | 48.00 | 46.20 | 72.54 | 72.42 | 69.30 | 75.60 | 384.06 |
| 6 | Switzerland | Guillaume Dutoit; Jonathan Suckow | 48.60 | 46.80 | 64.80 | 71.61 | 77.52 | 63.84 | 373.17 |
| 7 | Germany | Timo Barthel; Lars Rüdiger | 49.20 | 51.00 | 72.42 | 70.35 | 66.15 | 63.84 | 372.96 |
| 8 | Poland | Kasper Lesiak; Andrzej Rzeszutek | 46.80 | 46.20 | 65.10 | 67.32 | 70.38 | 63.84 | 359.64 |
| 9 | Austria | Alexander Hart; Nikolaj Schaller | 44.40 | 44.40 | 61.20 | 67.89 | 60.30 | 67.32 | 345.51 |
| 10 | Croatia | Luka Martinović; Matej Nevešćanin | 47.40 | 41.40 | 60.30 | 50.22 | 65.28 | 57.60 | 322.20 |
| 11 | Georgia | Sandro Melikidze; Tornike Onikashvili | 42.00 | 34.20 | 54.00 | 61.38 | 57.60 | 60.18 | 309.36 |
| 12 | Greece | Grigorios Mitrou; Athanasios Tsirikos | 44.40 | 42.00 | 47.04 | 51.30 | 0.00 | 59.40 | 244.14 |
