= 2023 European Diving Championships – Team event =

Team event at the 2023 European Diving Championships
- Venue: Rzeszów Diving Arena
- Date: 22 June
- Competitors: 35 from 9 nations
- Teams: 9
- Winning points: 438.30

Medalists
gold medal	Kseniya Baylo; Danylo Konovalov; Anna Pysmenska; Oleksii Sereda	Ukraine
silver medal	Sarah Jodoin Di Maria; Lorenzo Marsaglia; Chiara Pellacani; Eduard Timbretti Gugiu	Italy
bronze medal	Valeria Antolino; Alberto Arévalo; Rocio Velázquez; Carlos Camacho	Spain

The Team event at the 2023 European Diving Championships was held on 22 June 2023. 8 teams of four divers, and one of three, contested over a combination of individual and mixed synchro, 3 meter and 10 metre dives. It was won by Ukraine.

== Results ==
The final was started at 17:00.

Rank	Nation	Divers	D1	D2	D3	D4	D5	D6	Total
1st place, gold medalist(s)	Ukraine	Kseniya Baylo; Danylo Konovalov; Hanna Pysmenska; Oleksiy Sereda	60.75	68.25	72.00	72.00	91.80	73.50	438.30
2nd place, silver medalist(s)	Italy	Sarah Jodoin Di Maria; Lorenzo Marsaglia; Chiara Pellacani; Eduard Timbretti Gugiu	64.50	61.25	64.50	60.80	72.00	75.20	398.25
3rd place, bronze medalist(s)	Spain	Valeria Antolino; Alberto Arévalo; Rocío Velázquez; Carlos Camacho	50.40	68.40	67.50	62.35	62.40	70.40	381.45
4	Germany	Timo Barthel; Lena Hentschel; Moritz Wesemann; Christina Wassen	36.00	89.30	66.00	56.00	59.40	70.40	377.10
5	France	Juliette Landi; Jules Bouyer; Jade Gillet; Alexis Jandard	47.25	69.75	46.20	39.20	67.20	72.00	341.60
6	Norway	Caroline Kupka; Isak Børslien; Helle Tuxen	48.60	48.05	58.50	47.85	67.20	33.60	303.80
7	Great Britain	Desharne Bent-Ashmeil; Ben Cutmore; Robbie Lee; Eden Cheng	42.00	61.25	61.50	0.00	0.00	67.20	231.95
8	Armenia	Alisa Kakaryan; Vladimir Harutyunyan; Arman Enokyan; Marat Grigoryan	0.00	49.00	40.50	42.05	52.80	31.50	215.85
9	Greece	Theofilos Afthinos; Stavroula Chalemou; Grigorios Mitrou; Athanasios Tsirikos	0.00	0.00	46.20	0.00	0.00	40.85	87.05
