= Diving at the 2016 European Aquatics Championships – Men's 1 m springboard =

Won by Illya Kvasha

Men's 1 m springboard at the 2016 European Aquatics Championships
- Dates: 10 May
- Competitors: 24 from 15 nations
- Winning points: 439.70

Medalists
gold medal	Illya Kvasha	Ukraine
silver medal	Giovanni Tocci	Italy
bronze medal	Constantin Blaha	Austria

The Men's 1 m springboard competition of the 2016 European Aquatics Championships was held on 10 May 2016.

== Results ==
The preliminary round was held at 12:00. The final round was held at 19:30.

Green denotes finalists

Rank	Diver	Nationality	Preliminary		Final	
Rank	Diver	Nationality	Points	Rank	Points	Rank
1st place, gold medalist(s)	Illya Kvasha	Ukraine	424.35	1	439.70	1
2nd place, silver medalist(s)	Giovanni Tocci	Italy	352.25	8	414.30	2
3rd place, bronze medalist(s)	Constantin Blaha	Austria	401.55	2	402.55	3
4	Oleh Kolodiy	Ukraine	378.15	5	390.65	4
5	Matthieu Rosset	France	400.55	3	390.15	5
6	Nikita Shleikher	Russia	338.35	10	388.50	6
7	Frederick Woodward	Great Britain	356.25	7	378.20	7
8	Oliver Dingley	Ireland	364.95	6	373.90	8
9	Jordan Houlden	Great Britain	332.40	12	368.55	9
10	Evgenii Novoselov	Russia	383.65	4	364.05	10
11	Andrzej Rzeszutek	Poland	335.95	11	362.05	11
12	Kacper Lesiak	Poland	343.05	9	325.50	12
13	Nicolás García	Spain	325.00	13		
14	Frithjof Seidel	Germany	323.55	14		
15	Jouni Kallunki	Finland	321.40	15		
16	Alberto Arévalo	Spain	314.75	16		
17	Guillaume Dutoit	Switzerland	313.00	17		
18	Fabian Brandl	Austria	298.15	18		
19	Simon Rieckhoff	Switzerland	291.00	19		
20	Jack Ffrench	Ireland	286.70	20		
21	Joey van Etten	Netherlands	286.40	21		
22	Juho Junttila	Finland	284.80	22		
23	Vinko Paradzik	Sweden	272.25	23		
24	Yury Naurozau	Belarus	271.10	24		
