= 2019 European Diving Championships – Men's 3 metre synchro springboard =

Men's 3 metre synchro springboard event at the 2019 European Diving Championships was contested on 10 August.

== Results ==
11 pairs of athletes participated at the single-round event.

Rank	Divers	Nationality	D1	D2	D3	D4	D5	D6	Total
1st place, gold medalist(s)	Evgeny Kuznetsov; Nikita Shleikher	Russia	49.80	51.00	77.52	88.62	85.50	89.25	435.69
2nd place, silver medalist(s)	Patrick Hausding; Lars Rüdiger	Germany	51.60	51.60	68.82	68.25	80.85	77.52	398.64
3rd place, bronze medalist(s)	Anthony Harding; Jordan Houlden	Great Britain	48.00	47.40	76.50	62.22	71.40	82.08	387.60
4	Oleksandr Gorshkovozov; Oleg Kolodiy	Ukraine	49.80	50.40	77.52	78.66	57.75	72.42	386.55
5	Lorenzo Marsaglia; Giovanni Tocci	Italy	46.80	46.80	69.75	74.46	54.60	79.56	371.97
6	Gwendal Bisch; Alexis Jandard	France	45.00	45.00	64.80	68.82	61.20	77.70	362.52
7	Kacper Lesiak; Andrzej Rzeszutek	Poland	48.00	44.40	65.10	67.32	55.08	68.40	348.30
8	Guillaume Dutoit; Simon Rieckhoff	Switzerland	40.80	36.60	65.70	67.32	65.10	58.14	333.66
9	Sandro Melikidze; Tornike Onikashvili	Georgia	45.00	39.60	61.20	64.17	58.50	49.50	317.97
10	Alexandr Molchan; Pavel Saurytski	Belarus	45.00	43.80	56.70	42.30	56.70	61.38	305.88
11	Azat Harutyunyan; Vladimir Harutyunyan	Armenia	45.00	45.00	55.80	50.22	44.88	60.90	301.80
