= Diving at the 2026 European Aquatics Championships – Men's 1 m springboard =

Men's 1 m springboard at the 2026 European Aquatics Championships
- Venue: Paris Aquatic Centre
- Dates: 1 August
- Competitors: 31 from 20 nations
- Winning points: 431.45

Medalists
gold medal	Moritz Wesemann	Germany
silver medal	Jack Laugher	Great Britain
bronze medal	Jordan Houlden	Great Britain

The Men's 1 m springboard competition at the 2026 European Aquatics Championships was held on 1 August 2026.

== Results ==
The preliminary round was started at 10:00. The final was started at 21:25.

Green denotes finalists

Rank	Diver	Nationality	Preliminary		Final	
Rank	Diver	Nationality	Points	Rank	Points	Rank
1st place, gold medalist(s)	Moritz Wesemann	Germany	369.10	2	431.45	1
2nd place, silver medalist(s)	Jack Laugher	Great Britain	350.95	6	418.25	2
3rd place, bronze medalist(s)	Jordan Houlden	Great Britain	360.55	3	410.30	3
4	Lorenzo Marsaglia	Italy	357.20	4	387.00	4
5	Jules Bouyer	France	379.25	1	384.30	5
6	Isak Børslien	Norway	353.35	5	382.65	6
7	Andrzej Rzeszutek	Poland	337.90	8	376.10	7
8	Danylo Konovalov	Ukraine	329.85	10	358.80	8
9	Stanislav Oliferchyk	Ukraine	325.20	12	358.75	9
10	Grigory Ivanov	Neutral Athletes B	330.80	9	355.45	10
11	Ilia Molchanov	Neutral Athletes B	328.10	11	350.15	11
12	Gwendal Bisch	France	340.35	7	323.95	12
13	Jonathan Schauer	Germany	321.55	13	Did not advance	
14	Max Liñan	Spain	319.60	14	Did not advance	
15	Elias Petersen	Sweden	305.80	15	Did not advance	
16	Jake Passmore	Ireland	303.15	16	Did not advance	
17	Matteo Santoro	Italy	302.25	17	Did not advance	
18	Nikolaj Schaller	Austria	300.30	18	Did not advance	
19	Erik Passerone	Switzerland	298.40	19	Did not advance	
20	Alexandru Avasiloae	Romania	292.30	20	Did not advance	
21	Theofilos Afthinos	Greece	290.50	21	Did not advance	
22	Kacper Lesiak	Poland	289.00	22	Did not advance	
23	Folke Barenius	Sweden	274.55	23	Did not advance	
24	Luka Martinović	Croatia	273.85	24	Did not advance	
25	Tornike Onikashvili	Georgia	264.40	25	Did not advance	
26	Maro Kokić	Croatia	258.45	26	Did not advance	
27	Aleksandre Tskhomelidze	Georgia	250.80	27	Did not advance	
28	Matthew Hibbert	Netherlands	250.50	28	Did not advance	
28	Sebastian Konecki	Lithuania	250.50	28	Did not advance	
30	Yauheni Kandratovich	Neutral Athletes A	249.30	30	Did not advance	
31	Gertas Varneckis	Lithuania	203.20	31	Did not advance	
