= Diving at the 2026 European Aquatics Championships – Men's 3 m springboard =

Men's 3 m springboard at the 2026 European Aquatics Championships
- Venue: Paris Aquatic Centre
- Dates: 5 August
- Competitors: 31 from 19 nations
- Winning points: 506.80

Medalists
gold medal	Moritz Wesemann	Germany
silver medal	Jules Bouyer	France
bronze medal	Jordan Houlden	Great Britain

The Men's 3 m springboard competition at the 2026 European Aquatics Championships was held on 5 August 2026.

== Results ==
The preliminary round was started at 10:30. The final was started at 19:55.

Green denotes finalists

Rank	Diver	Nationality	Preliminary		Final	
Rank	Diver	Nationality	Points	Rank	Points	Rank
1st place, gold medalist(s)	Moritz Wesemann	Germany	446.25	1	506.80	1
2nd place, silver medalist(s)	Jules Bouyer	France	383.00	10	484.60	2
3rd place, bronze medalist(s)	Jordan Houlden	Great Britain	413.10	3	474.90	3
4	Ross Haslam	Great Britain	420.40	2	469.80	4
5	Lou Massenberg	Germany	377.65	11	434.20	5
6	Kirill Boliukh	Ukraine	410.05	4	426.95	6
7	Giovanni Tocci	Italy	406.25	6	424.20	7
8	Alexis Jandard	France	405.05	7	420.35	8
9	Nikolaj Schaller	Austria	373.40	12	412.70	9
10	Nikita Shleikher	Neutral Athletes B	406.75	5	409.15	10
11	Grigory Ivanov	Neutral Athletes B	389.35	9	393.30	11
12	Matteo Santoro	Italy	390.05	8	363.25	12
13	Andrzej Rzeszutek	Poland	367.95	13	Did not advance	
14	Maksym Mirza	Ukraine	358.55	14	Did not advance	
15	Juan Cortés	Spain	358.00	15	Did not advance	
16	David Ledinski	Croatia	354.75	16	Did not advance	
17	Jake Passmore	Ireland	350.85	17	Did not advance	
18	Folke Barenius	Sweden	337.50	18	Did not advance	
19	Alexandru Avasiloae	Romania	326.85	19	Did not advance	
20	Elias Petersen	Sweden	322.90	20	Did not advance	
21	Dariush Lotfi	Austria	318.60	21	Did not advance	
22	Max Liñan	Spain	316.15	22	Did not advance	
23	Theofilos Afthinos	Greece	310.40	23	Did not advance	
24	Luka Martinović	Croatia	310.30	24	Did not advance	
25	Antoine Chevnine	Switzerland	310.15	25	Did not advance	
26	Sebastian Konecki	Lithuania	303.05	26	Did not advance	
27	Isak Børslien	Norway	302.10	27	Did not advance	
28	Aleksandre Tskhomelidze	Georgia	291.90	28	Did not advance	
29	Yauheni Kandratovich	Neutral Athletes A	289.50	29	Did not advance	
30	Tornike Onikashvili	Georgia	280.95	30	Did not advance	
31	Gertas Varneckis	Lithuania	274.55	31	Did not advance	
	Matsvei Lupeka	Neutral Athletes A	Did not start		Did not advance	
