= Diving at the 2018 European Aquatics Championships – Men's 3 m synchro springboard =

Championship

Men's 3 m synchro springboard at the 2018 European Aquatics Championships
- Venue: Royal Commonwealth Pool
- Dates: 10 August
- Competitors: 20 from 10 nations
- Teams: 10
- Winning points: 431.16

Medalists
| gold medal | Evgeny Kuznetsov; Ilya Zakharov | Russia |
| silver medal | Jack Laugher; Chris Mears | Great Britain |
| bronze medal | Patrick Hausding; Lars Ruediger | Germany |

The Men's 3 m synchro springboard competition of the 2018 European Aquatics Championships was held on 10 August 2018.

== Results ==
The final was started at 13:30.

| Place | Country | Athlete | Points | | | | | | |
| Place | Country | Athlete | T1 | T2 | T3 | T4 | T5 | T6 | Total |
|---|---|---|---|---|---|---|---|---|---|
| 1st place, gold medalist(s) | Russia | Evgeny Kuznetsov; Ilya Zakharov | 52.80 | 52.20 | 65.88 | 86.10 | 79.56 | 94.62 | 431.16 |
| 2nd place, silver medalist(s) | Great Britain | Jack Laugher; Chris Mears | 49.80 | 48.60 | 83.64 | 85.68 | 84.24 | 78.66 | 430.62 |
| 3rd place, bronze medalist(s) | Germany | Patrick Hausding; Lars Rüdiger | 50.40 | 48.00 | 66.96 | 75.48 | 77.70 | 76.23 | 394.77 |
| 4 | Ukraine | Oleksandr Horshkovozov; Oleh Kolodiy | 48.60 | 48.00 | 75.48 | 76.26 | 58.14 | 72.42 | 378.90 |
| 5 | Italy | Andrea Chiarabini; Giovanni Tocci | 48.60 | 45.00 | 74.46 | 68.25 | 62.22 | 72.54 | 371.07 |
| 6 | Poland | Kacper Lesiak; Andrzej Rzeszutek | 49.20 | 48.00 | 67.50 | 72.54 | 72.42 | 56.10 | 365.76 |
| 7 | Switzerland | Guillaume Dutoit; Simon Rieckhoff | 47.40 | 43.80 | 64.80 | 62.22 | 62.31 | 67.32 | 347.85 |
| 8 | Armenia | Azat Harutyunyan; Vladimir Harutyunyan | 43.20 | 41.40 | 61.20 | 55.80 | 62.22 | 71.40 | 335.22 |
| 9 | Greece | Nikolaos Molvalis; Athanasios Tsirikos | 46.20 | 43.80 | 48.36 | 55.80 | 48.72 | 55.80 | 298.68 |
| 10 | Georgia | Sandro Melikidze; Tornike Onikashvili | 37.80 | 39.00 | 58.50 | 60.45 | 57.60 | 35.70 | 289.05 |
