= Diving at the 2022 Commonwealth Games – Men's 3 metre springboard =

Men's 3 metre springboard at the 2022 Commonwealth Games
- Venue: Sandwell Aquatics Centre
- Date: 6 August
- Competitors: 15 from 8 nations
- Winning score: 484.45

Medalists
gold medal	Daniel Goodfellow	England
silver medal	Jordan Houlden	England
bronze medal	Jack Laugher	England

The men's 3 metre springboard is part of the Diving at the 2022 Commonwealth Games program. The competition will be held on 6 August 2022 at Sandwell Aquatics Centre in Birmingham.

== Format ==
The competition will be held in two rounds:

- Preliminary round: All divers perform six dives; the top 12 divers advance to the final.
- Final: The 12 divers perform six dives; the preliminary round scores are erased and the top three divers win the gold, silver and bronze medals accordingly.

== Schedule ==
All times are British Summer Time (UTC+1).

Date	Start	Round
Saturday 6 August 2022	10:05	Preliminary
Saturday 6 August 2022	18:05	Finals

== Results ==
England's Daniel Goodfellow led an English one-two-three in the 3 metre Springboard, with reigning champion and Olympic medalist Jack Laugher, only able to win bronze.

Green denotes finalists

Rank	Diver	Preliminary		Final						
Rank	Diver	Points	Rank	Dive 1	Dive 2	Dive 3	Dive 4	Dive 5	Dive 6	Points
1st place, gold medalist(s)	Daniel Goodfellow (ENG)	430.05	3	73.10	71.40	84.00	91.65	77.90	86.40	484.45
2nd place, silver medalist(s)	Jordan Houlden (ENG)	414.35	5	73.10	69.70	85.75	81.90	88.20	66.50	465.15
3rd place, bronze medalist(s)	Jack Laugher (ENG)	350.90	11	74.80	75.25	86.70	84.60	53.20	87.75	462.30
4	James Heatly (SCO)	423.40	4	64.50	66.30	75.25	73.50	87.75	93.10	460.40
5	Li Shixin (AUS)	456.65	1	76.50	77.50	74.80	69.00	80.50	70.20	448.50
6	Yona Knight-Wisdom (JAM)	446.85	2	69.75	63.00	76.50	85.00	75.25	76.00	445.50
7	Ooi Tze Liang (MAS)	394.85	6	66.65	70.95	84.00	61.20	68.40	76.50	427.70
8	Liam Stone (NZL)	387.85	8	63.00	67.50	64.50	63.00	65.10	74.80	397.90
9	Bryden Hattie (CAN)	388.60	7	67.50	58.50	52.50	63.00	74.40	57.80	373.70
10	Sam Fricker (AUS)	356.90	10	64.50	69.75	42.00	63.00	60.00	71.40	370.65
11	Ross Beattie (SCO)	377.00	9	64.50	60.00	65.10	48.00	64.50	62.90	365.00
12	Frazer Tavener (NZL)	326.40	12	63.00	56.10	46.50	48.00	49.50	49.50	312.60
13	Cameron Gammage (SCO)	325.50	13	did not advance						
14	Cédric Fofana (CAN)	272.60	14	did not advance						
15	Dulanjan Fernando (SRI)	217.95	15	did not advance						
