= Diving at the 2024 European Aquatics Championships – Men's 3 m synchro springboard =

Men's 3 m synchro springboard at the 2024 European Aquatics Championships
- Venue: Serbian Institute For Sports And Sports Medicine
- Dates: 23 June
- Competitors: 20 from 10 nations
- Teams: 10

Medalists
gold medal	Jules Bouyer; Alexis Jandard	France
silver medal	Juan Pablo Cortes; Nicolás García	Spain
bronze medal	Kacper Lesiak; Andrzej Rzeszutek	Poland

The Men's 3 m synchro springboard competition of the 2024 European Aquatics Championships was held on 23 June 2024.

== Results ==
The final was started at 15:30.

Rank	Nation	Divers	Points						
Rank	Nation	Divers	T1	T2	T3	T4	T5	T6	Total
1st place, gold medalist(s)	France	Jules Bouyer; Alexis Jandard	50.40	43.20	77.52	83.22	70.38	79.80	404.52
2nd place, silver medalist(s)	Spain	Juan Pablo Cortes; Nicolás García	44.40	48.60	69.30	72.54	65.70	78.54	379.08
3rd place, bronze medalist(s)	Poland	Kacper Lesiak; Andrzej Rzeszutek	48.60	49.20	67.50	65.10	68.34	76.50	375.24
4	Italy	Stefano Belotti; Matteo Santoro	49.20	48.00	66.03	68.34	67.20	53.04	351.81
5	Great Britain	Leon Baker; Hugo Thomas	46.80	44.40	72.90	60.30	54.60	70.68	349.68
6	Germany	Lou Massenberg; Jonathan Schauer	46.20	45.00	65.70	66.96	57.12	66.30	347.28
7	Ukraine	Oleh Kolodiy; Danylo Konovalov	48.60	42.60	56.10	69.75	57.00	67.32	341.37
8	Croatia	David Ledinski; Matej Nevešćanin	43.80	41.40	63.90	66.96	64.26	60.30	340.62
9	Austria	Dariush Lotfi; Nikolaj Schaller	43.80	45.60	56.70	63.90	60.45	63.24	333.69
10	Serbia	Nikola Paraušić; Bogdan Savić	38.40	31.20	42.93	36.12	48.60	52.08	249.33
