= Diving at the 2022 European Aquatics Championships – Men's 3 m synchro springboard =

Men's 3 m synchro springboard at the 2022 European Aquatics Championships
- Venue: Foro Italico
- Dates: 21 August
- Competitors: 16 from 8 nations
- Teams: 8

Medalists
gold medal	Anthony Harding; Jack Laugher	Great Britain
silver medal	Lorenzo Marsaglia; Giovanni Tocci	Italy
bronze medal	Oleksandr Horshkovozov; Oleh Kolodiy	Ukraine

The men's 3 m synchro springboard competition of the 2022 European Aquatics Championships was held on 21 August 2022.

== Results ==
The final was started at 15:30.

Rank	Nation	Divers	Points						
Rank	Nation	Divers	T1	T2	T3	T4	T5	T6	Total
1st place, gold medalist(s)	Great Britain	Anthony Harding; Jack Laugher	49.20	48.60	85.68	64.26	84.36	80.73	412.83
2nd place, silver medalist(s)	Italy	Lorenzo Marsaglia; Giovanni Tocci	52.80	43.20	71.61	84.66	72.00	63.24	387.51
3rd place, bronze medalist(s)	Ukraine	Oleksandr Horshkovozov; Oleh Kolodiy	47.40	48.60	76.50	73.47	64.98	73.44	384.39
4	Switzerland	Guillaume Dutoit; Jonathan Suckow	44.40	42.00	72.90	71.61	76.50	60.42	367.83
5	Germany	Timo Barthel; Moritz Wesemann	44.40	46.80	73.44	77.70	38.85	60.42	341.61
6	Greece	Theofilos Afthinos; Nikolaos Molvalis	43.20	37.80	59.40	50.40	64.17	64.80	319.77
7	Georgia	Sandro Melikidze; Tornike Onikashvili	43.80	40.20	54.90	51.00	62.10	60.45	312.45
8	Sweden	David Ekdahl; Elias Petersen	42.60	36.00	54.90	60.30	58.50	58.59	310.89
