= Anthony Harding (diver) =

British diver (born 2000)

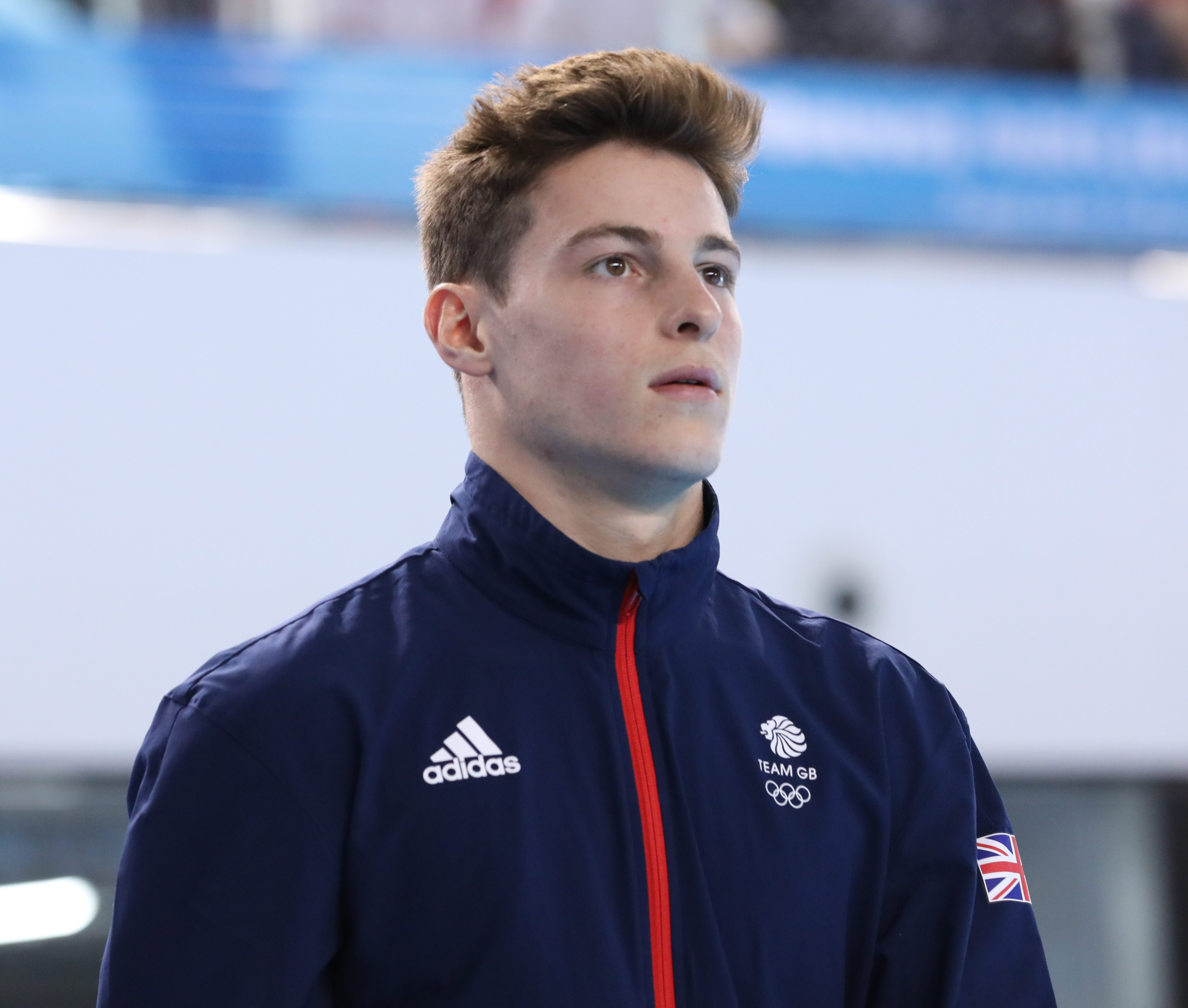
- Harding in 2018

Personal information
- Born: 30 June 2000 (age 26) Ashton-under-Lyne, England
- Height: 1.73 m (5 ft 8 in)
- Weight: 67 kg (148 lb)

Sport
- Country: Great Britain
- Sport: Diving
- Events: 3 m, 3 m synchro
Medal record
Event	1st	2nd	3rd
Olympic Games	0	0	1
World Championships	0	2	1
European Championships	1	0	2
Commonwealth Games	1	0	0
Olympic Games
Bronze medal – third place	2024 Paris	3 m synchro
World Championships
Silver medal – second place	2022 Budapest	3 m synchro
Silver medal – second place	2023 Fukuoka	3 m synchro
Bronze medal – third place	2025 Singapore	3 m synchro
European Aquatics Championships
Gold medal – first place	2022 Rome	3 m synchro
European Diving Championships
Bronze medal – third place	2019 Kyiv	3 m synchro
Bronze medal – third place	2019 Kyiv	Team
Representing England
Commonwealth Games
Gold medal – first place	2022 Birmingham	3 m synchro

Anthony Harding (born 30 June 2000) is an English diver specialising in the 3 metre synchronised event, and achieving his greatest success partnered with Jack Laugher. He won a bronze medal in the synchronised three metre springboard at the 2024 Summer Olympics having won silver in the same event at the 2022 World Aquatics Championships. He again took bronze at the 2025 World Championships. He is the 2022 European and Commonwealth Games champion in the same event.

== Early life ==
Harding grew up in Ashton-under-Lyne in Greater Manchester. He joined the City of Leeds diving club at age 10, and relocated to Leeds without his family at age 16. He studied at Elliott Hudson College, before starting a course in electronic engineering at Leeds City College.

== Career ==
Harding participated in the 2018 Summer Youth Olympics in Buenos Aires, where he won the silver medal behind Daniel Restrepo in the boy's 3m springboard event.

After the 2020 Summer Olympics in August 2021 Harding started training together with Jack Laugher. They won the silver medal in the synchronized 3m springboard event at the 2022 World Aquatics Championships in Budapest.

Alongside Jack Laugher, he won a bronze medal in the synchronised three metre springboard at the 2024 Paris Olympics.

In 2025, at the World Championships in Singapore, he won a bronze medal with Jack Laugher, in the 3 metre synchro springboard.
