= Long Daoyi =

Chinese diver (born 2003)

Long Daoyi 龙道一
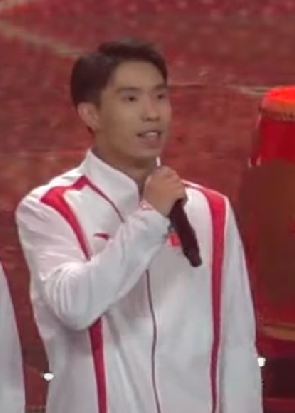
- Long in 2024

Personal information
- Born: 6 March 2003 (age 23) Rongjiang, Guizhou, China

Sport
- Country: China
- Sport: Diving
Medal record
Olympic Games
Gold medal – first place	2024 Paris	3 m synchro
World Championships
Gold medal – first place	2023 Fukuoka	3 m synchro
Gold medal – first place	2024 Doha	3 m synchro
Bronze medal – third place	2023 Fukuoka	3 m springboard

Long Daoyi (Chinese: 龙道一; pinyin: Lóng Dàoyī, born 6 March 2003) is a Chinese athlete who competes in diving. He won two medals at the 2023 World Aquatics Championships, winning gold in the 3m synchro springboard and bronze in the 3m springboard. At the 2024 Summer Olympics, he won a gold medal with Wang Zongyuan in the 3m synchro event.

== International awards ==
World Aquatics Championships
Year	Place	Medal	Type
2023	Fukuoka (Japan)	Gold	Springboard 3m synchro
2023	Fukuoka (Japan)	Bronze	Springboard 3m
