= Diving at the 2015 European Games – Men's 10 metre platform =

Men's 10 metre platform at the 2015 European Games
- Venue: Baku Aquatics Centre
- Dates: 21 June
- Competitors: 20 from 15 nations
- Winning points: 588.25

Medalists
gold medal	Matty Lee	Great Britain
silver medal	Nikita Shleikher	Russia
bronze medal	Alexis Jandard	France

The men's 10 metre platform competition at the 2015 European Games in Baku took place on 21 June at the Baku Aquatics Centre.

== Results ==
The preliminary round was started at 13:04. The final was held at 20:17.

Green denotes finalists

Rank	Diver	Nationality	Preliminary		Final	
Rank	Diver	Nationality	Points	Rank	Points	Rank
1st place, gold medalist(s)	Matty Lee	Great Britain	514.45	2	588.25	1
2nd place, silver medalist(s)	Nikita Shleikher	Russia	520.65	1	556.55	2
3rd place, bronze medalist(s)	Alexis Jandard	France	462.10	4	526.20	3
4	Matthew Dixon	Great Britain	441.60	6	493.85	4
5	Boris Efremov	Russia	483.15	3	481.40	5
6	Vladimir Barbu	Italy	442.20	5	473.80	6
7	Artsiom Barouski	Belarus	413.00	8	454.55	7
8	Artyom Danilov	Azerbaijan	407.45	10	438.25	8
9	Kıvanç Gür	Turkey	391.25	12	405.20	9
10	Cao-Tre Le Nguyen	Germany	439.30	7	394.80	10
11	Dimitar Isaev	Bulgaria	392.15	11	394.50	11
12	Yevhen Naumenko	Ukraine	411.20	9	366.75	12
13	Alin Ronțu	Romania	388.40	13	did not advance	
14	Martin Christensen	Denmark	387.10	14	did not advance	
15	Nikita Kryvopshyn	Ukraine	378.25	15	did not advance	
15	Juan Socorro	Spain	378.25	15	did not advance	
17	Samuel D'Alessandro	Italy	359.30	17	did not advance	
18	Krystian Sawicki	Poland	343.50	18	did not advance	
19	Pascal Faatz	Netherlands	334.45	19	did not advance	
20	Mihai Andrei	Romania	304.60	20	did not advance	
