= Diving at the 2019 Pan American Games – Men's 1 metre springboard =

Men's 1 metre springboard at the 2019 Pan American Games
- Venue: Aquatics Centre
- Dates: August 1
- Competitors: 16 from 10 nations
- Winning score: 435.60

Medalists
Gold medal	Juan Celaya	Mexico
Silver medal	Yona Knight-Wisdom	Jamaica
Bronze medal	Andrew Capobianco	United States

The men's 1 metre springboard competition of the diving events at the 2019 Pan American Games was held on 1 August at the Aquatics Centre in Lima, Peru.

== Schedule ==
Date	Time	Round
August 1, 2019	10:00	Preliminary
August 1, 2019	20:30	Final

== Results ==
Green denotes finalists

Rank	Diver	Nationality	Preliminary		Final	
Rank	Diver	Nationality	Points	Rank	Points	Rank
1st place, gold medalist(s)	Juan Celaya	Mexico	368.00	2	435.60	1
2nd place, silver medalist(s)	Yona Knight-Wisdom	Jamaica	378.20	1	429.90	2
3rd place, bronze medalist(s)	Andrew Capobianco	United States	356.30	4	411.25	3
4	Yahel Castillo	Mexico	358.80	3	410.20	4
5	Sebastián Morales	Colombia	345.25	6	398.55	5
6	Michael Hixon	United States	334.90	8	385.80	6
7	Rafael Quintero	Puerto Rico	354.50	5	382.20	7
8	Daniel Restrepo	Colombia	344.45	7	366.20	8
9	Kawan Pereira	Brazil	309.00	9	343.00	9
10	Donato Neglia	Chile	289.45	11	333.25	10
11	Ian Matos	Brazil	304.10	10	314.75	11
12	Laydel Domínguez	Cuba	286.95	12	309.30	12
13	Diego Carquin	Chile	286.55	13		
14	Angello Alcebo	Cuba	274.50	14		
15	Frandiel Gómez	Dominican Republic	261.95	15		
16	Daniel Pinto	Peru	251.35	16		
