= Diving at the 2022 Commonwealth Games – Men's 1 metre springboard =

Men's 1 metre springboard at the 2022 Commonwealth Games
- Venue: Sandwell Aquatics Centre
- Date: 4 August
- Competitors: 11 from 7 nations
- Winning score: 447.05

Medalists
gold medal	Jack Laugher	England
silver medal	Li Shixin	Australia
bronze medal	Jordan Houlden	England

The men's 1 metre springboard is part of the Diving at the 2022 Commonwealth Games program. The competition was held on 4 August 2022 at Sandwell Aquatics Centre in Birmingham.

== Format ==
The competition will be held in two rounds:

- Preliminary round: All divers perform six dives; the top 12 divers advance to the final. If there are 12 or fewer entrants, all entrants progress with final order decided by preliminaries score.
- Final: Divers perform six dives; the preliminary round scores are erased and the top three divers win the gold, silver and bronze medals accordingly.

== Schedule ==
All times are British Summer Time (UTC+1).

Date	Start	Round
4 August	13:05	Preliminary
4 August	18:05	Finals

== Results ==
The preliminary field was announced on 20 July 2022; it remains subject to change: With 11 entrants, all divers qualified for the final, with preliminary scores used to set start order in the final.

Jack Laugher of England won his third successive Commonwealth Games gold medal in 1 metre springboard, equalling the record of Canadian Alexandre Despatie.

Green denotes finalists

Rank	Diver	Preliminary		Final	
Rank	Diver	Points	Rank	Points	Rank
1st place, gold medalist(s)	Jack Laugher (ENG)	383.90	4	447.05	1
2nd place, silver medalist(s)	Li Shixin (AUS)	388.70	1	437.05	2
3rd place, bronze medalist(s)	Jordan Houlden (ENG)	384.10	3	429.30	3
4	James Heatly (SCO)	387.55	2	401.00	4
5	Yona Knight-Wisdom (JAM)	383.60	5	383.10	5
6	Liam Stone (NZL)	362.35	7	377.90	6
7	Cédric Fofana (CAN)	366.60	6	357.70	7
8	Bryden Hattie (CAN)	344.15	8	350.05	8
9	Danny Mabbott (SCO)	287.25	10	318.45	9
10	Ross Beattie (SCO)	308.55	9	300.60	10
11	Dulanjan Fernando (SRI)	188.15	11	232.50	11
