= Betsy Sullivan =

Jamaican diver

Personal information
- Nationality: Jamaican
- Born: 5 January 1956 (age 69)

Sport
- Sport: Diving

Betsy Sullivan (born 5 January 1956) is a Jamaican diver. She competed in the women's 3 metre springboard event at the 1972 Summer Olympics.
