= Cédric Fofana =

Canadian diver

Personal information
- Born: September 15, 2003 (age 22) Montreal, Quebec, Canada
Medal record
Men's diving
Representing Canada
FINA World Junior Diving Championships
Bronze medal – third place	2018 Kyiv	3 m springboard (14-15)

Cédric Fofana (born September 15, 2003) is a Canadian diver in the springboard (3 metre) events.

== Career ==
In 2018, Fofana won bronze in the 14-15 age category in the springboard (3 m) diving event at the 2018 FINA World Junior Diving Championships in Kyiv, Ukraine.

In July 2021, Fofana won the individual 3 m springboard competition at the Canadian Olympic Diving trials. This qualified him to compete in the individual event at the 2020 Summer Olympics, However, at the Tokyo Olympics he did not proceed beyond the preliminary round, finishing last in a field of 29 divers.

He competed at the 2022 Commonwealth Games where he came 7th in the Men's 1 metre springboard event.
