= Yona Knight-Wisdom =

Jamaican diver (born 1995)

Personal information
- Full name: Yona Roshen Knight-Wisdom
- Nationality: British, Jamaican
- Born: 12 May 1995 (age 31) Leeds, England, UK
- Height: 190 cm (6 ft 3 in)
- Weight: 90 kg (198 lb)

Sport
- Country: Jamaica
- Sport: Diving
Medal record
Men's diving
Representing Jamaica
Pan American Games
Silver medal – second place	2019 Lima	1 m springboard

Yona Roshen Knight-Wisdom (born 12 May 1995) is a diver. Born in England, he represents Jamaica internationally. He competed at the 2016, 2020 and 2024 Summer Olympics. He placed 2nd in the 1 metre springboard event at the 2019 Pan American Games. He was the first Jamaican male diver and first Caribbean male diver at an Olympic Games.

== Early life ==
Knight-Wisdom was born in Leeds, England. His father, Trevor Wisdom, is from Jamaica and his mother, Grace Knight, is from Barbados. Knight-Wisdom studied at Leeds Grammar School, and is a graduate of Leeds Beckett University, where he studied sport and exercise science.

== Diving career ==
Knight-Wisdom's diving career began in 2004; he has said that he took up the sport after seeing it at the 2004 Summer Olympic Games. He started diving for City of Leeds Diving club along with British divers Jack Laugher, Chris Mears, Rebecca Gallantree and Alicia Blagg. Knight-Wisdom has said of himself that "I am a 190 cm tall, 90 kg heavy, black diver... Watch a diving event and that is not something you will see very often."

=== International career ===
In 2012, Knight-Wisdom decided to represent Jamaica in international competition; he had been eligible to compete for Barbados or Great Britain, but had struggled to get in the British team. Knight-Wisdom competed at the 2014 Commonwealth Games, making him Jamaica's first-ever male Commonwealth diving competitor; (Note: Betsy Sullivan competed for Jamaica in the 1966 British Empire and Commonwealth Games.) Knight-Wisdom finished fifth in the 1 metre springboard event, and eleventh in the 3 metre springboard event. He competed at the 2015 World Aquatics Championships.

Knight-Wisdom placed 2nd at the 2016 FINA Diving World Cup, which also qualified him for the 2016 Summer Olympics. He was named Leeds Beckett University Sportsman of the Year for 2016.

At the 2016 Summer Olympics in Rio de Janeiro, Knight-Wisdom became the first male Jamaican diver at the Olympics, as well as the first male diver from any Caribbean nation. (Note: Betsy Sullivan competed for Jamaica in the 1972 Olympic Women's 3 metre springboard.)

Knight-Wisdom came in 2nd in the 1 metre springboard event at the 2019 Pan American Games. He competed in the 3 metre springboard event at the delayed 2020 Summer Olympics in Tokyo. He finished 15th in the semi-final, and did not progress to the final. He competed at the 2022 Commonwealth Games where he placed 5th in the Men's 1 metre springboard event and 6th in the Men's 3 metre springboard event.

Knight-Wisdom competed in the 3 metre springboard event at the 2024 Summer Olympics in Paris.

== Personal life ==
Knight-Wisdom lives and trains in Edinburgh.
