= Jack Laugher =

British diver (born 1995)

Jack Laugher MBE
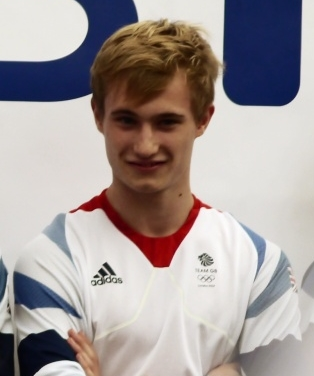
- Laugher in 2012

Personal information
- Full name: Jack David Laugher
- Born: 30 January 1995 (age 31) Ripon, North Yorkshire, England
- Height: 1.66 m (5 ft 5 in)
- Weight: 65 kg (143 lb)

Sport
- Country: Great Britain
- Sport: Diving
- Events: 1 m springboard; 3 m springboard; 3 m synchro
- Club: City of Leeds Diving Club
Medal record
Men's diving
Representing Great Britain
Olympic Games
| Gold medal – first place | 2016 Rio de Janeiro | 3 m synchro |
| Silver medal – second place | 2016 Rio de Janeiro | 3 m springboard |
| Bronze medal – third place | 2020 Tokyo | 3 m springboard |
| Bronze medal – third place | 2024 Paris | 3 m synchro |
World Championships
| Silver medal – second place | 2019 Gwangju | 3 m synchro |
| Silver medal – second place | 2022 Budapest | 1 m springboard |
| Silver medal – second place | 2022 Budapest | 3 m synchro |
| Silver medal – second place | 2023 Fukuoka | 3 m synchro |
| Bronze medal – third place | 2015 Kazan | 3 m springboard |
| Bronze medal – third place | 2015 Kazan | 3 m synchro |
| Bronze medal – third place | 2019 Gwangju | 3 m springboard |
| Bronze medal – third place | 2022 Budapest | 3 m springboard |
| Bronze medal – third place | 2025 Singapore | 3 m synchro |
European Championships
| Gold medal – first place | 2016 London | 3 m synchro |
| Gold medal – first place | 2018 Glasgow | 1 m springboard |
| Gold medal – first place | 2018 Glasgow | 3 m springboard |
| Gold medal – first place | 2022 Rome | 1 m springboard |
| Gold medal – first place | 2022 Rome | 3 m synchro |
| Silver medal – second place | 2016 London | 3 m springboard |
| Silver medal – second place | 2018 Glasgow | 3 m synchro |
| Silver medal – second place | 2020 Budapest | 1 m springboard |
| Silver medal – second place | 2026 Paris | 1 m springboard |
FINA Diving World Series
| Gold medal – first place | 2015 Series | 3 m springboard |
FINA Diving World Cup
| Gold medal – first place | 2021 Tokyo | 3 m synchro |
| Silver medal – second place | 2018 Wuhan | 3 m synchro |
| Bronze medal – third place | 2014 Shanghai | 3 m springboard |
| Bronze medal – third place | 2018 Wuhan | 3 m springboard |
Representing England
Commonwealth Games
| Gold medal – first place | 2014 Glasgow | 1 m springboard |
| Gold medal – first place | 2014 Glasgow | 3 m synchro |
| Gold medal – first place | 2018 Gold Coast | 1 m springboard |
| Gold medal – first place | 2018 Gold Coast | 3 m springboard |
| Gold medal – first place | 2018 Gold Coast | 3 m synchro |
| Gold medal – first place | 2022 Birmingham | 1 m springboard |
| Gold medal – first place | 2022 Birmingham | 3 m synchro |
| Silver medal – second place | 2014 Glasgow | 3 m springboard |
| Bronze medal – third place | 2022 Birmingham | 3 m springboard |

Jack David Laugher (/lɔː/ LOR; born 30 January 1995) is a British diver competing for Great Britain and England. A specialist on springboard, he competes in individual springboard events, and in synchronised events with Chris Mears, Daniel Goodfellow and Anthony Harding. Laugher and Mears became Britain's first diving Olympic champions by winning a gold medal in the men's synchronised 3m springboard event at the 2016 Summer Olympics in Rio, an achievement many had expected double world 10m champion Tom Daley would achieve first. A week later, Laugher won a silver in the men's individual 3m springboard at the same Games, becoming the first British diver to win multiple Olympic diving medals at the same Games. As of 2024, this silver remans the highest placing by an individual British diver at the Olympic Games.

Laugher was a double Commonwealth Games champion for England at the 2014 Games in Glasgow, a double champion again at the 2022 Games in Birmingham (in 1m springboard and 3m synchro on both occasions), and a triple champion (1 metre springboard, 3 metre springboard and 3 metre synchro) in the 2018 Games at the Gold Coast. He was the first British diver to win two medals at the same World Championships, the 2015 World Championships. In 2015, Laugher won the overall title in the FINA Diving World Series for 3-metre springboard.

== Early life ==
Laugher was born on 30 January 1995 in Harrogate, North Yorkshire to David and Jackie Laugher. He was educated at Ripon Grammar School, a co-educational state grammar school in Ripon, North Yorkshire.

Laugher became interested in diving when he was seven during a family visit to Harrogate Hydro Swimming Pool and a lifeguard told him to go for diving lessons. He began to learn diving at the Harrogate and District Diving Club at the Hydro. He broke his upper arm when he was 14 during a trampolining competition, and had a metal plate inserted to hold his humerus bone together.

Laugher has stated that his surname is pronounced 'Law'.

== Diving career ==
=== 2010–2011 ===
Laugher won the one-metre and three-metre springboard titles at the 2010 European Junior Championships and the 2010 World Junior Championships.

In September 2010, he competed at the World Junior Championships in Tucson, Arizona and won gold at both the 1m and 3m springboard events. In October that year, he represented England at the 2010 Commonwealth Games where he was partnered with Oliver Dingley in the synchro.

Greg Louganis was reported as being impressed with Laugher's diving.

=== 2012–2015 ===
In 2012, Laugher was selected for the Great Britain 2012 London Olympics team. On 6 August 2012, he competed in the Men's 3-metre springboard, but he failed to make it to the semi-final stage. In October 2012, Laugher became the Junior World champion again, winning the 3m springboard in Adelaide, Australia. He won the 3m Synchro competition with Tom Daley.

Laugher first teamed up with Chris Mears in the 3-metre Springboard in 2013. In October 2013, he took on the role of Ambassador for the sport of VX.

In July 2014, he won bronze in the 3m springboard at the World Cup held in Shanghai. Soon afterwards, at the 2014 Commonwealth Games, he won the gold medal in the 1m springboard, then a second gold in the 3m synchro with Chris Mears.

At the 2015 World Championship in Kazan, Russia, Laugher and Mears won bronze in the 3m springboard synchro, thus qualifying for the Rio Olympics. Laugher then won a second bronze in the individual 3m springboard, making him the first Briton to win two medals in a World Championships.

=== 2016 Olympics ===
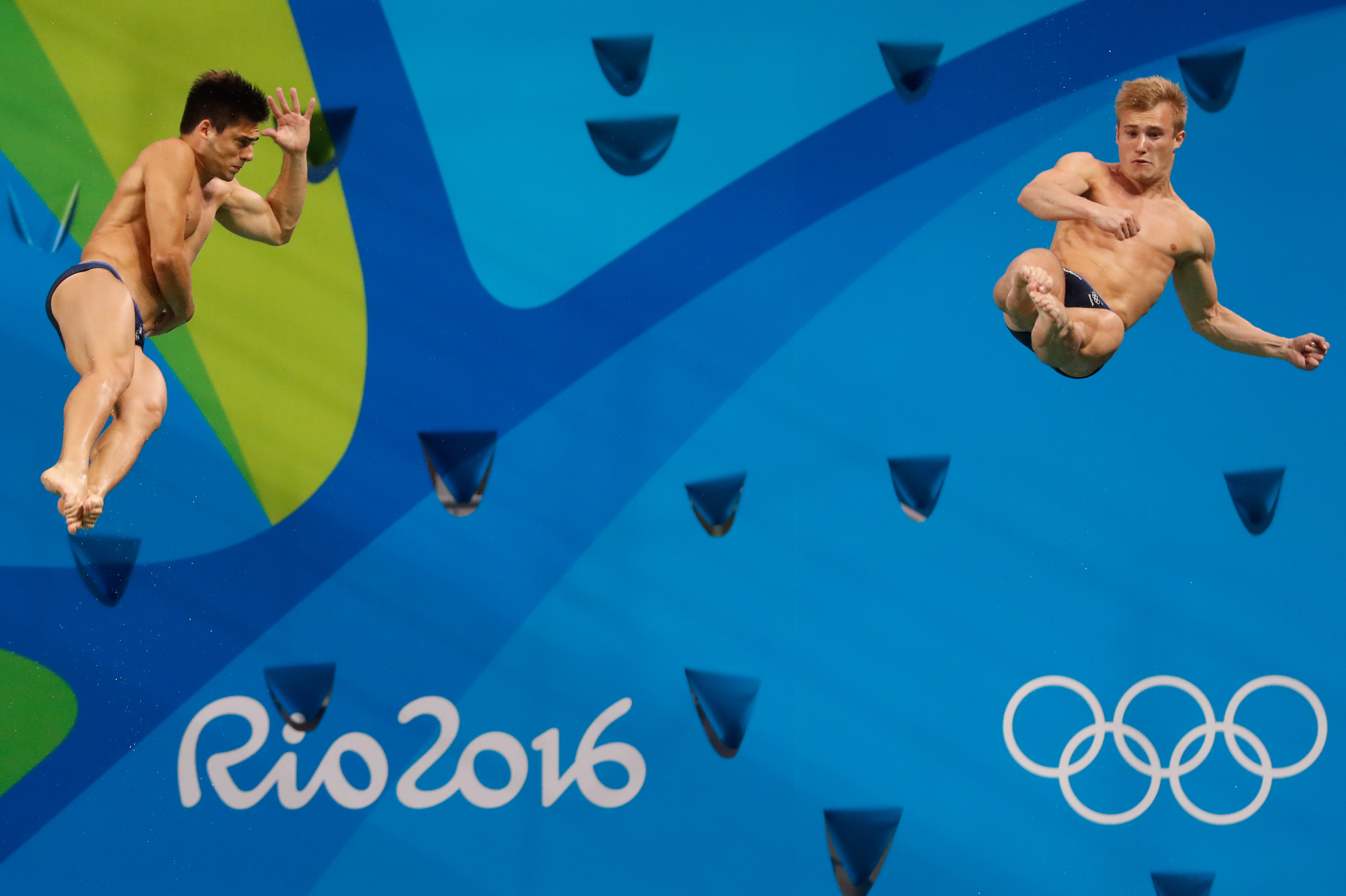
Chris Mears and Jack Laugher at the 2016 Olympics in Rio

In January 2016, Laugher suffered a foot injury while training. In May 2016, he won the 3m synchronised springboard at the European Championships in London with Mears, and a silver in the individual 3m springboard.

At the 2016 Olympics, Laugher and Mears became the first ever diving gold medal winners for Great Britain in the men's synchronised 3-metre springboard. They scored 454.32, beating the American Sam Dorman and Michael Hixon (450.21) in silver medal position and the Chinese pair Qin Kai and Cao Yuan in bronze (443.70). Laugher also won silver medal in the individual 3-metre springboard.

=== 2017 ===
Laugher and Mears won three silvers in the 3m Synchro in four events of the Fina/NVC Diving World Series, two in China and one in Russia. However, they finished out of the medal position in fourth at the 2017 World Aquatics Championships.

=== 2018 ===
At the 2018 Commonwealth Games held on the Gold Coast, Australia, Laugher successfully defended his title on the 1m springboard. The next day, he added another gold after winning the 3m springboard event, then followed it up with a third gold of the Games after winning the men's 3-metre synchronised springboard with Chris Mears. Earlier in the year, Mears and Laugher also won a silver in 3-metre synchro springboard at the 2018 FINA Diving World Cup held in Wuhan. He also won a bronze in individual 3m springboard at the same event.

At the 2018 European Championships in Glasgow/Edinburgh, Laugher won gold in the men's 1 metre springboard. He won a second gold in the men's 3-metre springboard, and added a silver to this tally in the championships with a second place in the 3-metre synchro springboard with Chris Mears. He won a total of 5 international titles in 2018, for which he was honoured with European male diver of the year a second time by Ligue Europeenne de Natation (LEN).

=== 2019 ===
Jack Laugher partnered with Dan Goodfellow in men's synchronised 3m springboard since his regular partner Chris Mears had decided to take a break from competition and then retired. At the 2019 World Aquatics Championships held in Gwangju, South Korea, he won silver with Goodfellow in the 3m synchronised. In his individual 3m springboard, after leading for much of the competition, he finished in the bronze position after an error in the final dive.

=== 2021–22 ===
At the 2021 FINA Diving World Cup held in Japan as an official test event for the delayed 2020 Tokyo Olympics, Laugher and Goodfellow won gold in synchronised 3m springboard. Laugher also won silver 11 days later in men's 1m springboard at the 2020 European Aquatics Championships.

At the Tokyo Olympics, Laugher and Dan Goodfellow came 7th in the men's synchronised 3m springboard. He won the bronze medal in the individual 3m springboard.

At the 2022 World Aquatics Championships held in Budapest, Laugher partnered with Anthony Harding for the first time in an international competition, and won silver in the synchro 3m springboard event. Laugher also won an individual silver in the men's 1 m springboard, and a bronze in the 3m springboard event.

=== 2024 ===
Laugher was selected for his fourth Olympics when he was named in the Great Britain squad for the 2024 Paris Olympics. Alongside Anthony Harding, he won bronze in the synchronised three metre springboard to claim his fourth Olympic medal. In the individual three metre springboard, Laugher finished seventh.

=== 2025 ===
In 2025, at the World Championships in Singapore, he won a bronze medal with Anthony Harding, in the 3 metre synchro springboard.

== Personal life ==
Laugher started dating Lois Toulson in early 2017.

Laugher is supportive of the LGBT community and said: "I have quite a few gay friends, just from school and people I've met through diving and my journey. Everyone should feel comfortable to be gay and be who they are." During the Paris 2024 Olympics, it was confirmed that Laugher, along with other male members of the British diving team, were posting pictures on the subscription-based online platform OnlyFans to make extra cash to make up for a perceived funding shortfall. His father Dave Laugher insisted to BBC News that his son only posts "safe content" of himself "in a pair of trunks", and that there was nothing explicit in these posts.

== Honours ==
In 2017, Laugher won Diver of the Year at the British Swimming Awards. At the 2018 British Swimming Awards, he won both the Diving Athlete of the Year and the Overall Athlete of the Year. He was named European male diver of the year for 2016 by Ligue Europeenne de Natation (LEN), and again in 2018.

Laugher, along with Mears, was appointed Member of the Order of the British Empire (MBE) in the 2017 New Year Honours for services to diving.

== Diving achievements ==
| Competition | 2007 | 2008 | 2009 | 2010 | 2011 | 2012 | 2013 | 2014 | 2015 | 2016 | 2017 | 2018 | 2019 | 2020 | 2021 | 2022 | 2024 |
|---|---|---|---|---|---|---|---|---|---|---|---|---|---|---|---|---|---|
| Olympics, 3m springboard synchronised | | | | | | | | | | 1st | | | | | | 7th | 3rd |
| Olympics, 3m springboard | | | | | | 27th | | | | 2nd | | | | | 3rd | | 7th |
| World Championships, 1m springboard | | | | | 33rd | | 19th | | | | | | | | | | |
| World Championships, 3m springboard | | | | | 7th | | 16th | | 3rd | | 5th | | | | | | |
| World Championships, 3m synchro | | | | | | | | | 3rd | | 4th | | | | | | |
| European Championships, 1m springboard | | | | | | | | | | | | 1st | | | | | |
| European Championships, 3m springboard | | | | | | 6th | | | | 2nd | | 1st | | | | | |
| European Championships, 3m synchro | | | | | | | | | | 1st | | 2nd | | | | | |
| Commonwealth Games, 1m springboard | | | | | | | | 1st | | | | 1st | | | | 1st | |
| Commonwealth Games, 3m springboard | | | | 11th | | | | 2nd | | | | 1st | | | | 3rd | |
| Commonwealth Games, 3m synchro | | | | 7th | | | | 1st | | | | 1st | | | | 1st | |
| FINA World Cup, 3m springboard | | | | 31st | | 8th | | 3rd | | | | 3rd | | | | | |
| FINA World Cup, 3m synchro | | | | | | | | 5th | | 4th | | 2nd | | | | | |
| World Junior Championships, 1m springboard | | | | 1st | | | | | | | | | | | | | |
| World Junior Championships, 3m springboard | | | | 1st | | 1st | | | | | | | | | | | |
| World Junior Championships, 3m synchro | | | | 10th | | 1st | | | | | | | | | | | |
| European Junior Championships, 1m springboard | | | | 1st | | | | | | | | | | | | | |
| European Junior Championships, 3m springboard | | | | 1st | | | | | | | | | | | | | |
| European Junior Championships, 3m synchro | | | | 4th | | | | | | | | | | | | | |
| European Junior Championships, 10m platform | | | | 6th | | | | | | | | | | | | | |
| British Championships, 3m springboard | 14th | 6th | 8th | 3rd | 1st | 1st | | | | | | | | | | | |
| British Championships, 3m synchro | | | | 2nd | 2nd | | | | | | | | | | | | |
| British Championships, 1m springboard | | | | 3rd | | | | | | | | | | | | | |
| British Championships, 10m platform | | 8th | 2nd | | | | | | | | | | | | | | |
| British Gas National Cup, 1m springboard | | | | 11th | 1st | 1st | | | | | | | | | | | |
| British Gas National Cup, 3m springboard | | | | 4th | 1st | 1st | | | | | | | | | | | |
| British Gas National Cup, 3m synchro | | | | 3rd | | | | | | | | | | | | | |
