= Jordan Houlden =

English diver (born 1998)

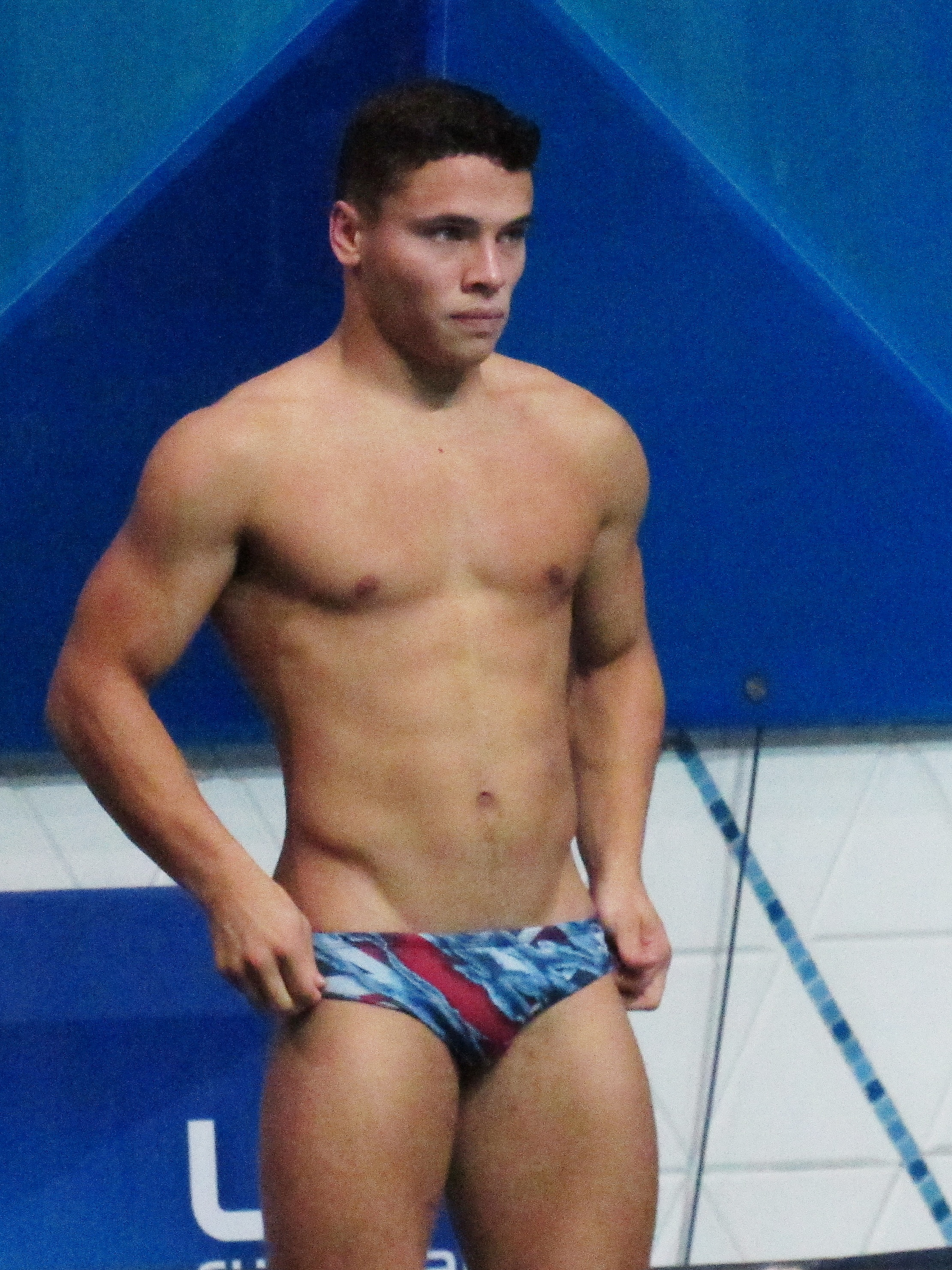
- Houlden at the 2019 European Diving Championships in Kyiv

Personal information
- Full name: Jordan Christopher Houlden
- Born: 25 July 1998 (age 28) Sheffield, England

Sport
- Country: Great Britain
- Sport: Diving
- Events: 1 m springboard; 3 m springboard; 3 m synchro
Medal record
Men's diving
Representing Great Britain
European Championships
Silver medal – second place	2022 Rome	3 m springboard
Bronze medal – third place	2026 Paris	1 m springboard
Bronze medal – third place	2026 Paris	3 m springboard
European Diving Championships
Bronze medal – third place	2019 Kyiv	3 m synchro
Representing England
Commonwealth Games
Silver medal – second place	2022 Birmingham	3 m springboard
Bronze medal – third place	2022 Birmingham	1 m springboard

Jordan Christopher Houlden (born 25 July 1998) is an English diver from the City Of Sheffield Diving Club. He is a silver medalist of the 2022 European Diving Championships.

== Career ==
Houlden won at the ASA National Age Group Championships in 2010, silver in the Group C 1m Springboard. He made progress through the junior rankings, including winning Group B 1m gold with the ASA England Programmes team at the 2013 Trofeo Niccolò Campo in Rome.

After making his European Junior debut in 2014, Houlden was one of the standout English junior divers in 2015, winning Group A 1m gold at the British Elite Junior Championships. In June 2015 he competed at the inaugural 2015 European Games in Baku, finishing fourth in the 3m Springboard despite not diving five months prior due to breaking his thumbs. He became 2015 ASA England Programmes Athlete of the Year for diving. In May 2016 he was part of the British team at the 2016 LEN European Aquatics Championships.

He competed for England at the 2022 Commonwealth Games where he won a silver medal in the men's 3 m springboard event, a bronze medal in the men's 1 m springboard event and came 8th in the mixed 3 m springboard event.

In May 2023, he won the 3m springboard title at the British Diving Championships.

Houlden was selected to compete in the individual three metre springboard at the 2024 Paris Olympics. He finished fifth.

In 2025, at the World Championships in Singapore, he reached the finals of the 1 metre springboard and 3 metre springboard.
