= 2023 European Diving Championships =

Water sport competitions

- Host city: Rzeszów
- Country: Poland
- Nations: 25
- Athletes: 125
- Events: 13
- Dates: 22–28 June 2023
- Website: http://www2.len.eu/?p=14872

The 2023 European Diving Championships were held in Rzeszów, Poland from 22 to 28 June 2023. This was the seventh edition of the stand-alone Championships, and the 42nd European Championships in diving in total, including the diving portion of the European Aquatics Championships. For the first time, the championships were integrated into the 2023 European Games; the diving portion of the 2018 European Aquatics Championships had previously been integrated into the 2018 European Championships multi-sport event, while the European Junior Diving Championships previously formed part of the 2015 European Games program.

The event was a qualification event for the 2024 Summer Olympics with quota places awarded to the NOC of the winners of both men's and women's 3 metre and 10 metre events. All eight Olympic events were contested, with events in 1 m springboard for men and women, mixed synchro for both 3 metre springboard and 10 metre platform, and mixed team also being held.

The European Diving Trophy will also be awarded to the most successful overall team; the defending champions from 2022 are Great Britain.

== Medal table ==
* Host nation (Poland)

Rank	Nation	Gold	Silver	Bronze	Total
1	Ukraine	4	1	0	5
2	Germany	3	3	0	6
3	Great Britain	3	2	2	7
4	Italy	2	3	5	10
5	Switzerland	1	0	1	2
6	France	0	2	2	4
7	Sweden	0	2	1	3
8	Spain	0	0	2	2
Totals (8 entries)		13	13	13	39

== Medalists ==
=== Men ===
Event	Gold		Silver		Bronze	
1 m springboard	Ross Haslam; Great Britain	422.95	Alexis Jandard; France	411.50	Lorenzo Marsaglia; Italy	410.55
3 m springboard	Moritz Wesemann; Germany	465.40	Jules Bouyer; France	440.15	Alexis Jandard; France	430.70
10 m platform	Timo Barthel; Germany	435.40	Robbie Lee; Great Britain	413.20	Riccardo Giovannini; Italy	411.20
3 m synchro springboard	Ukraine; Oleh Kolodiy; Danylo Konovalov	410.16	Italy; Lorenzo Marsaglia; Giovanni Tocci	402.66	France; Jules Bouyer; Alexis Jandard	394.92
10 m synchro platform	Ukraine; Kirill Boliukh; Oleksiy Sereda	398.70	Italy; Riccardo Giovannini; Eduard Timbretti Gugiu	388.83	Great Britain; Ben Cutmore; Matthew Dixon	372.69

=== Women ===
Event	Gold		Silver		Bronze	
1 m springboard	Michelle Heimberg; Switzerland	273.25	Emilia Nilsson Garip; Sweden	273.10	Grace Reid; Great Britain	266.90
3 m springboard	Chiara Pellacani; Italy	321.45	Emilia Nilsson Garip; Sweden	316.60	Michelle Heimberg; Switzerland	306.70
10 m platform	Eden Cheng; Great Britain	331.60	Christina Wassen; Germany	330.95	Sarah Jodoin Di Maria; Italy	320.10
3 m synchro springboard	Great Britain; Desharne Bent-Ashmeil; Amy Rollinson	279.90	Germany; Lena Hentschel; Jana Lisa Rother	276.33	Italy; Elena Bertocchi; Chiara Pellacani	273.69
10 m synchro platform	Germany; Christina Wassen; Elena Wassen	297.72	Ukraine; Kseniya Baylo; Sofia Esman	274.68	Spain; Valeria Antolino; Ana Carvajal	261.48

=== Mixed ===
Event	Gold		Silver		Bronze	
3 m synchro springboard	Italy; Chiara Pellacani; Matteo Santoro	291.39	Great Britain; Grace Reid; James Heatly	283.89	Sweden; Emilia Nilsson Garip; Elias Petersen	282.60
10 m synchro platform	Ukraine; Kseniya Baylo; Kirill Boliukh	322.68	Germany; Elena Wassen; Alexander Lube	306.12	Italy; Sarah Jodoin Di Maria; Eduard Timbretti Gugiu	283.14
Team event	Ukraine; Kseniya Baylo; Danylo Konovalov; Anna Pysmenska; Oleksiy Sereda	438.30	Italy; Sarah Jodoin Di Maria; Lorenzo Marsaglia; Chiara Pellacani; Eduard Timbretti Gugiu	398.25	Spain; Valeria Antolino; Alberto Arévalo; Rocio Velázquez; Carlos Camacho	381.45

== Championships Trophy ==
The trophy is assigned to the nation with most points gained by the top 12 athletes or teams in each event.

== Paris 2024 qualification ==
The diving meet at the 2023 European Games is a direct qualification event for the diving program in Paris 2024. A total of 4 quota places will be awarded in four events: All four places are 'unnamed' which is to say they are won for the NOC, not the specific diver

Event	Qualification path	Quotas	NOCS
Men's 3 metre springboard	One NOC of the highest place finisher will receive one unnamed quota place in the relevant event.	1	Germany (Moritz Wesemann)
Women's 3 metre springboard	One NOC of the highest place finisher will receive one unnamed quota place in the relevant event.	1	Italy (Chiara Pellacani)
Men's 10 metre platform	One NOC of the highest place finisher will receive one unnamed quota place in the relevant event.	1	Germany (Timo Barthel)
Women's 10 metre platform	One NOC of the highest place finisher will receive one unnamed quota place in the relevant event.	1	Great Britain (Eden Cheng)
Total quota places		4	
