= Moritz Wesemann =

German diver (born 2002)

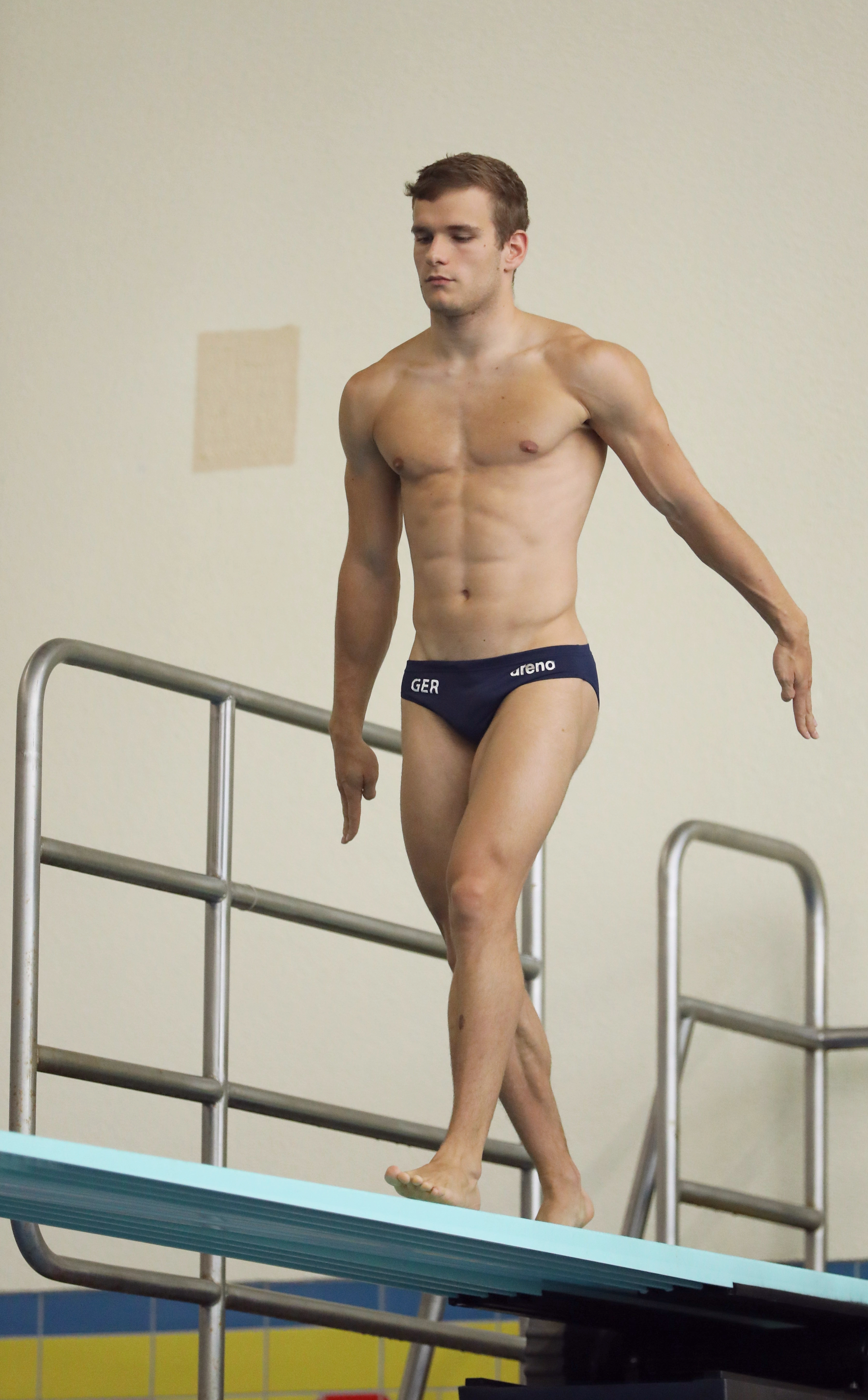
- Wesemann in 2023

Personal information
- Born: 10 May 2002 (age 24)
- Height: 1.70 m (5 ft 7 in)

Sport
- Country: Germany
- Sport: Diving
- Events: 3 m, 3 m synchro
Medal record
World Championships
Bronze medal – third place	2023 Fukuoka	Team
European Games
Gold medal – first place	2023 Kraków-Małopolska	3 m springboard
European Championships
Gold medal – first place	2026 Paris	1 m springboard
Gold medal – first place	2026 Paris	3 m springboard
European Diving Championships
Gold medal – first place	2023 Rzeszów	3 m springboard
Gold medal – first place	2025 Antalya	1 m springboard
Gold medal – first place	2025 Antalya	3 m synchro
Silver medal – second place	2025 Antalya	Team
Bronze medal – third place	2025 Antalya	3 m springboard
World University Games
Gold medal – first place	2025 Rhine-Ruhr	3 m springboard
Gold medal – first place	2025 Rhine-Ruhr	Mixed team

Moritz Wesemann (born 10 May 2002) is a German diver. He is the 2023 European champion in the 3 metre springboard event.

== Career ==
Wesemann participated in the 2021 FINA World Junior Diving Championships, where he won a silver medal in the 1 m springboard event. He qualified for the final of the 3 m springboard event at the 2022 word championships in Budapest. Due to a positive test for COVID-19 he had to withdraw from the final.

At the 2023 European Diving Championships, Wesemann won his first major international medal with gold in the 3 metre springboard event in front of Jules Bouyer and Alexis Jandard. With his gold medal, he secured a quota place for Germany at the 2024 Summer Olympics.
