= Lars Rüdiger =

German diver (born 1996)

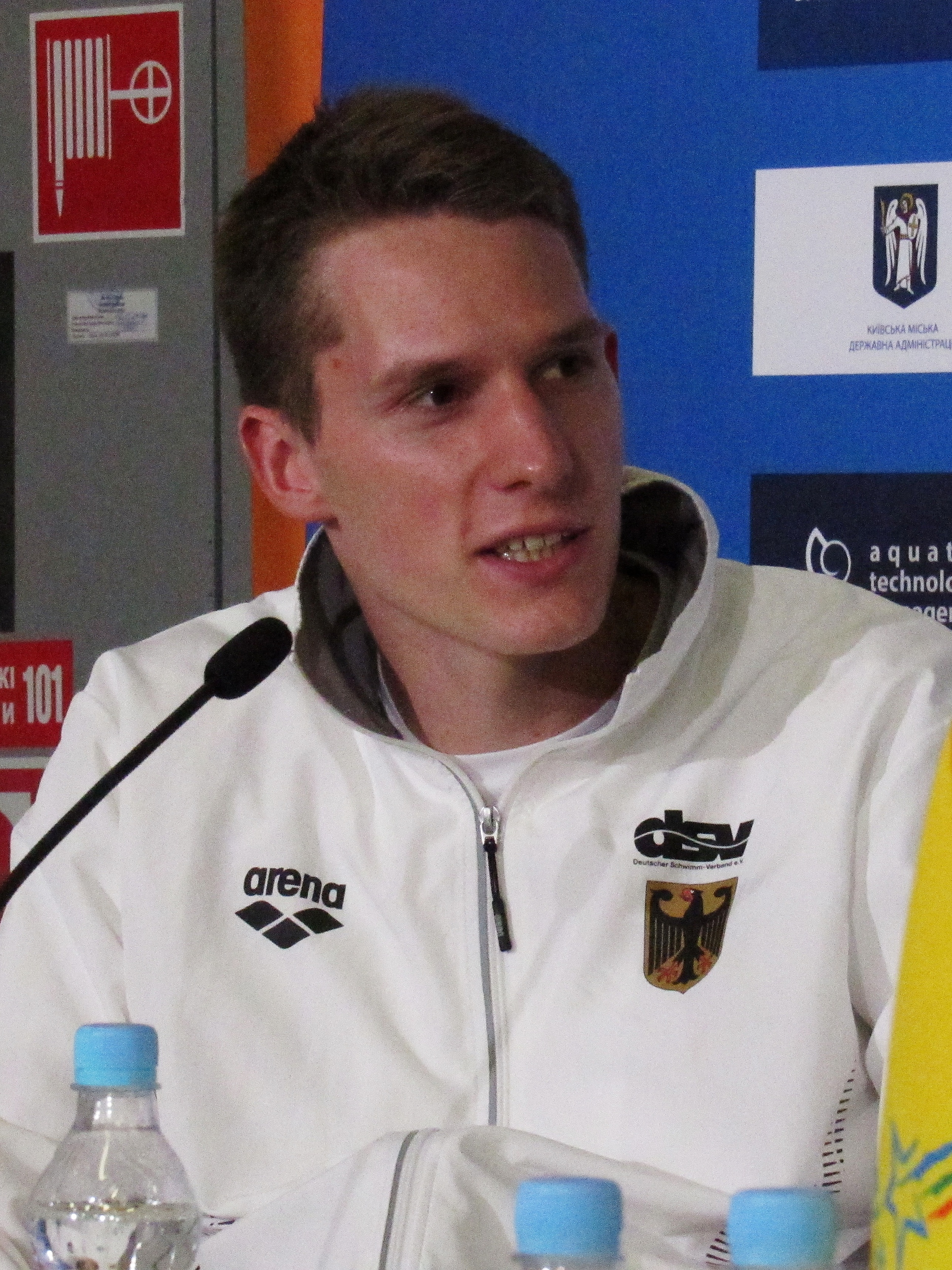
- Rüdiger in 2019

Personal information
- Nationality: German
- Born: 17 April 1996 (age 30) Berlin, Germany
- Height: 1.87 m (6 ft 2 in)
- Weight: 87 kg (192 lb)

Sport
- Country: Germany
- Sport: Diving
- Event(s): 3 m, 3 m synchro
Medal record
Olympic Games
Bronze medal – third place	2020 Tokyo	3 m synchro
World Championships
Bronze medal – third place	2022 Budapest	3 m synchro
European Championships
Gold medal – first place	2020 Budapest	3 m synchro
Silver medal – second place	2019 Kyiv	3 m synchro
Bronze medal – third place	2018 Glasgow	3 m synchro
Summer Universiade
Bronze medal – third place	2017 Taipei	Mixed team

Lars Rüdiger (born 17 April 1996) is a German diver.

With his partner Patrick Hausding, he won a bronze medal at the 2020 Summer Olympics in Tokyo in the Men's synchronized 3 metre springboard competition. He also won a bronze medal in the 3 m synchro springboard competition at the 2018 European Aquatics Championships.
