= Danylo Konovalov =

Ukrainian diver (born 2003)

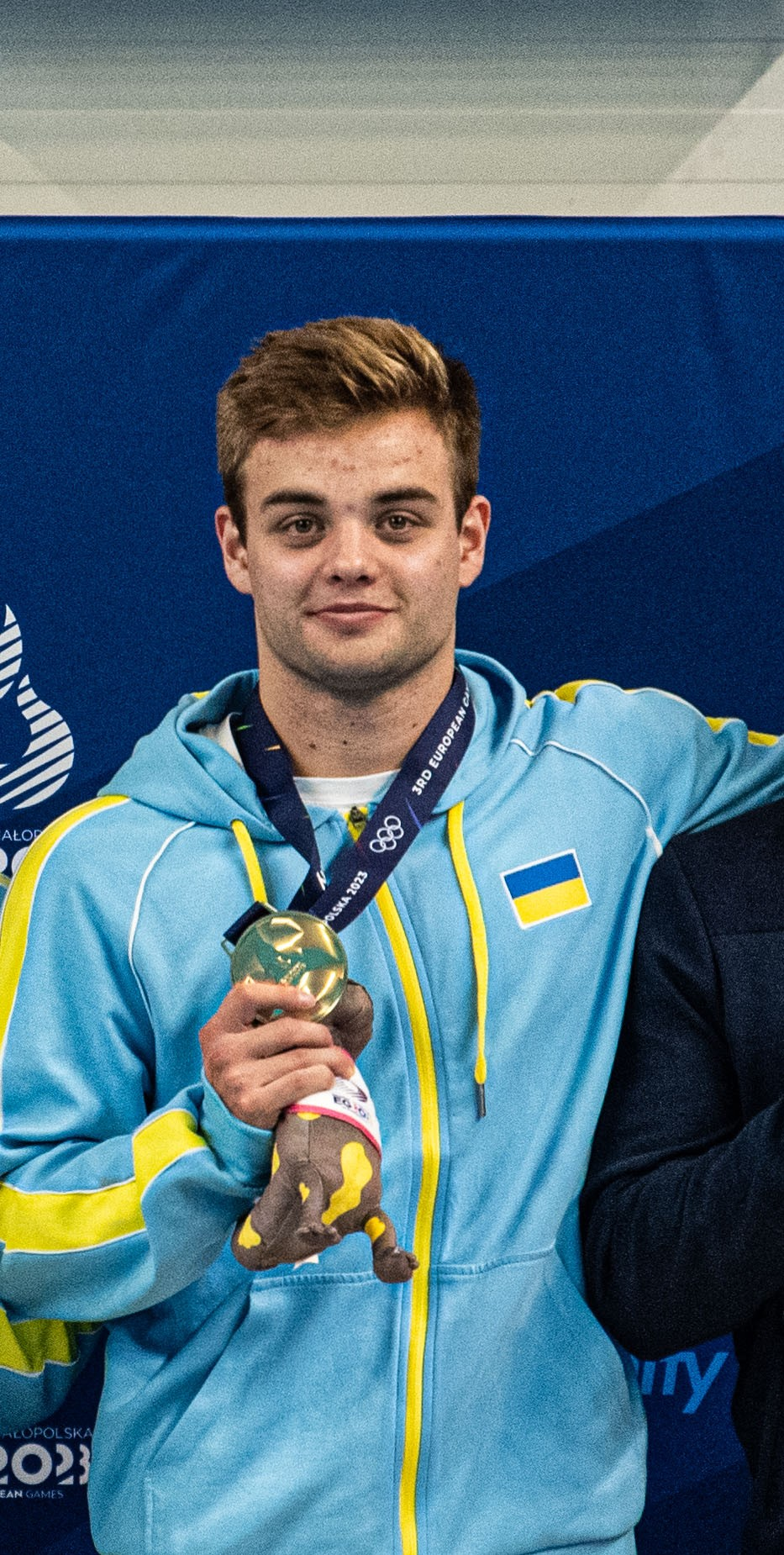
- Danylo Konovalov at the 2023 European Games

Personal information
- Native name: Данило В'ячеславович Коновалов
- Full name: Danylo Viacheslavovych Konovalov
- Citizenship: Ukraine
- Born: 18 April 2003 (age 23) Mykolaiv, Ukraine

Sport
- Sport: Diving
Medal record
Men's diving
Representing Ukraine
European Games
Gold medal – first place	2023 Kraków–Małopolska	3 m synchro
Gold medal – first place	2023 Kraków–Małopolska	Team
European Championships
Silver medal – second place	2022 Rome	Team event
European Diving Championships
Gold medal – first place	2023 Rzeszów	3 m synchro
Gold medal – first place	2023 Rzeszów	Team
Bronze medal – third place	2025 Antalya	1 m springboard
World Junior Championships
Gold medal – first place	2021 Kyiv	3m springboard A
Silver medal – second place	2021 Kyiv	3 m springboard synchro A/B

Danylo Konovalov (Ukrainian: Данило В'ячеславович Коновалов; born 18 April 2003 in Mykolaiv, Ukraine) is a Ukrainian diver. He is a silver medallist of the 2022 European Championships.

== Career ==
Konovalov's international debut took place at the 2021 World Junior Championships in Kyiv. He shared gold with Brazil's Kawan Pereira at the 3m springboard in age group A and won a silver medal together with his teammate Bohdan Chyzhovskyi in the 3m springboard synchro competitions.

At the World Championships in Budapest, he competed in the 3 metre springboard competition but finished just 50th in the preliminary round.

Konovalov won his first senior medal at the 2022 European Championships in Rome where he finished 2nd in the team event (together with Baylo, Kesar, and Boliukh).
