= Adrián Abadía =

Spanish diver (born 2002)

Personal information
- Full name: Adrián Giovanni Abadía García
- Born: 5 April 2002 (age 24) Mallorca, Spain
Medal record
Representing Spain
World Championships
Bronze medal – third place	2024 Doha	3m springboard synchro

Adrián Giovanni Abadía García (Note: In this Spanish name, the first or paternal surname is Abadía and the second or maternal family name is García.) (born 5 April 2002) is a Spanish athlete who competes in diving. He won a bronze medal at the 2024 World Aquatics Championships, in the 3m synchro springboard event.

Abadía competed at the 2024 Summer Olympics.

== International awards ==
World Championships
Year	Place	Medal	Event	Ref.
2024	Doha (Qatar)	Bronze	3m synchro springboard	
