= Alberto Arévalo =

Spanish diver (born 1995)

Personal information
- Full name: Alberto Arévalo Alcón
- Born: 8 February 1995 (age 31) Madrid, Spain
- Height: 1.74 m (5 ft 9 in)

Sport
- Country: Spain
- Sport: Diving
- Event: 3 metre springboard
Medal record
Men's diving
Representing Spain
European Games
Bronze medal – third place	2023 Kraków–Małopolska	Team
European Diving Championships
Bronze medal – third place	2023 Rzeszów	Team

Alberto Arévalo Alcón (Note: In this Spanish name, the first or paternal surname is Arévalo and the second or maternal family name is Alcón.) (born 8 February 1995) is a Spanish diver. He competed in the 2020 Summer Olympics.
