= Nicolás García (diver) =

Spanish diver (born 1995)

Personal information
- Full name: Nicolás García Boissier
- Nationality: Spanish
- Born: 25 June 1995 (age 31) Las Palmas, Spain
- Height: 1.76 m (5 ft 9 in)
- Weight: 71 kg (157 lb)

Sport
- Sport: Diving
- Event: 3 metre springboard
Medal record
Men's diving
Representing Spain
World Championships
Bronze medal – third place	2024 Doha	3 m synchro
European Championships
Silver medal – second place	2024 Belgrade	3 m springboard synchro

Nicolás García Boissier (born 25 June 1995) is a Spanish diver. He competed in the 2020 Summer Olympics.
