= Giovanni Tocci =

Italian diver (born 1994)

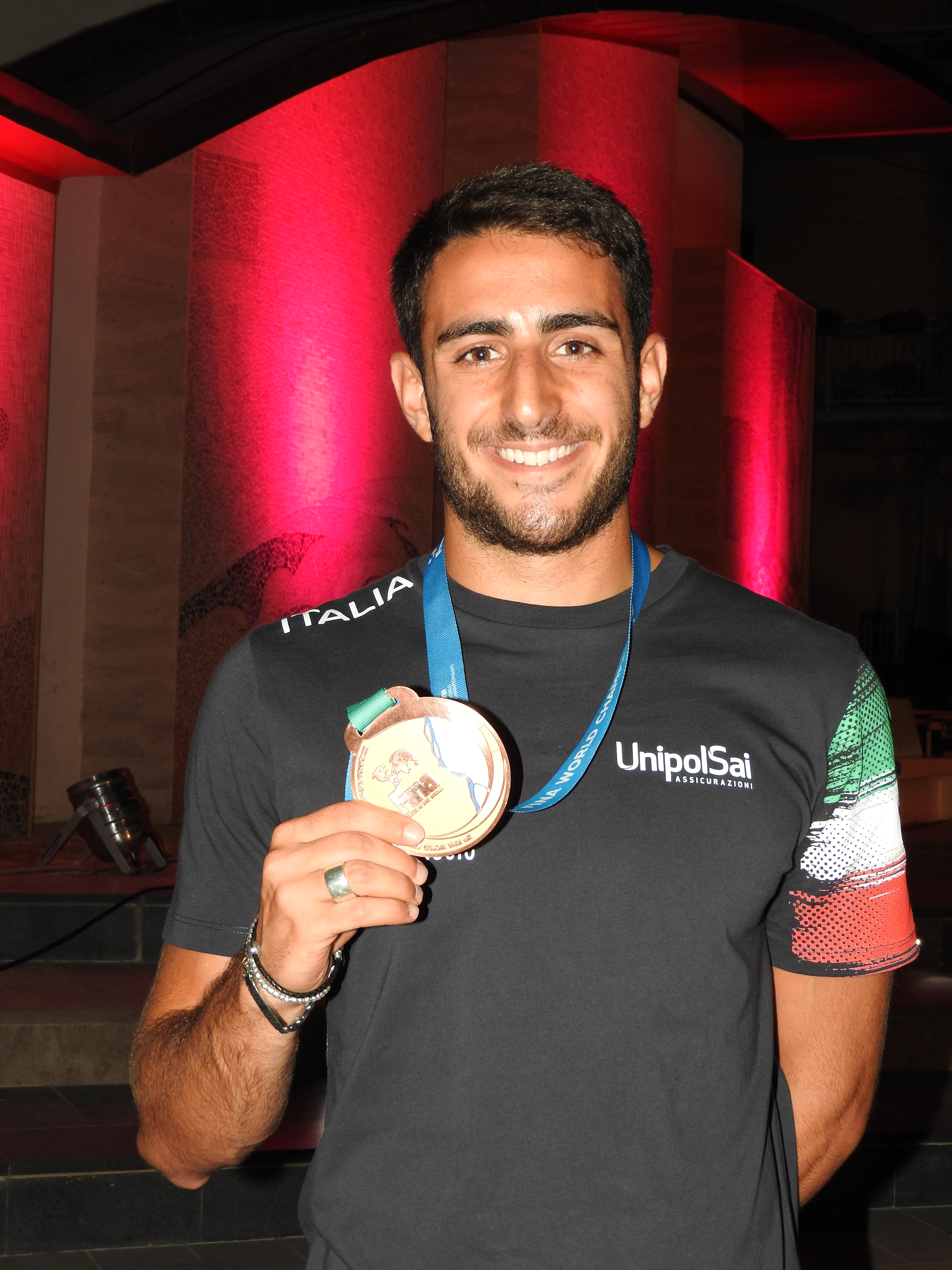
- Tocci in 2017

Personal information
- Nationality: Italian
- Born: 31 August 1994 (age 31) Cosenza, Italy
- Height: 1.75 m (5 ft 9 in)
- Weight: 68 kg (150 lb)

Sport
- Sport: Diving
- Event(s): 3 meter springboard, synchronized 3 metre springboard
- Club: Centro Sportivo Esercito
Medal record
Men's diving
Representing Italy
World Championships
Silver medal – second place	2024 Doha	3 m synchro
Bronze medal – third place	2017 Budapest	1 m springboard
European Games
Silver medal – second place	2023 Kraków-Małopolska	3 m synchro
European Aquatics Championships
Silver medal – second place	2016 London	1 m springboard
Silver medal – second place	2018 Glasgow	1 m springboard
Silver medal – second place	2022 Rome	3 m synchro
Bronze medal – third place	2020 Budapest	1 m springboard
Bronze medal – third place	2022 Rome	1 m springboard
Bronze medal – third place	2022 Rome	3 m springboard
European Diving Championships
Silver medal – second place	2023 Rzeszów	3 m synchro
Silver medal – second place	2025 Antalya	3 m synchro
Summer Universiade
Bronze medal – third place	2017 Taipei	3 m springboard

Giovanni Tocci (born 31 August 1994) is an Italian diver. He competed in the men's synchronized 3 metre springboard at the 2016 Summer Olympics, where he and Andrea Chiarabini finished 6th out of 8 teams.

At the 2018 European Championships in Glasgow, Tocci won a silver in the men's 1 metre springboard.
