= Jules Bouyer =

French diver (born 2002)

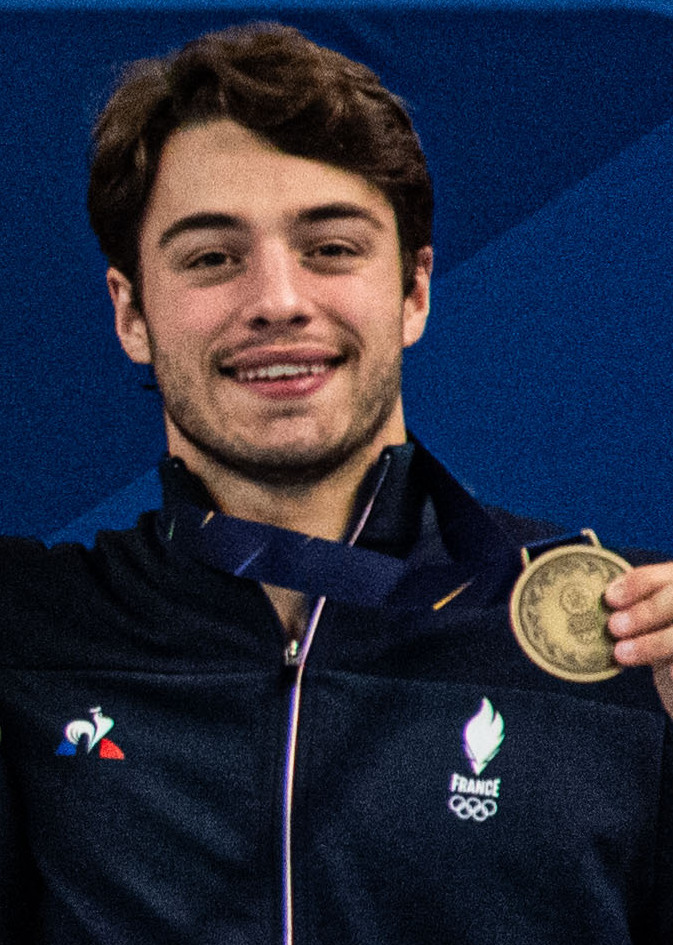
- Bouyer in 2023

Personal information
- Full name: Jules Bouyer
- Born: 22 July 2002 (age 24) Annecy, France
Medal record
Men's diving
Representing France
World Championships
Bronze medal – third place	2023 Fukuoka	3 m synchro
European Games
Silver medal – second place	2023 Kraków-Małopolska	3 m springboard
Bronze medal – third place	2023 Kraków-Małopolska	3 m synchro
European Championships
Gold medal – first place	2024 Belgrade	3 m synchro
Silver medal – second place	2026 Paris	3 m springboard
European Diving Championships
Silver medal – second place	2023 Rzeszow	3 m springboard
Bronze medal – third place	2023 Rzeszow	3 m synchro

Jules Bouyer (born 22 July 2002) is a French diver.

== Career ==
Bouyer started diving at a very young age. His potential was detected by his trainer who allowed him to join INSEP.

Bouyer finished in 11th place in the 3-metre springboard event at the 2018 Youth Olympic Games in Buenos Aires.

At the 2023 European Games, Bouyer was the silver medallist in the 3-meter springboard and the bronze medallist in the synchronized 3-meter springboard with Alexis Jandard.

On 15 July 2023 at the 2023 World Aquatics Championships in Fukuoka, Bouyer and Alexis Jandard won the bronze medal in the 3.4 metre synchronized event.

After a shoulder injury, Bouyer participated in the 2024 World Diving Championships in Doha, Qatar. He finished 5th, which allowed him to be qualified individually for the 2024 Summer Olympics.

== Awards ==
European Games
Year	Place	Medal	Event	Ref.
2023	Rzeszów (Poland)	Silver	3 m springboard	
2023	Rzeszów (Poland)	Bronze	3 m mixed team	
World Diving Championships
Year	Place	Medal	Event	Ref.
2023	Fukuoka (Japan)	Bronze	3 m mixed team	
