= Lorenzo Marsaglia =

Italian diver (born 1996)

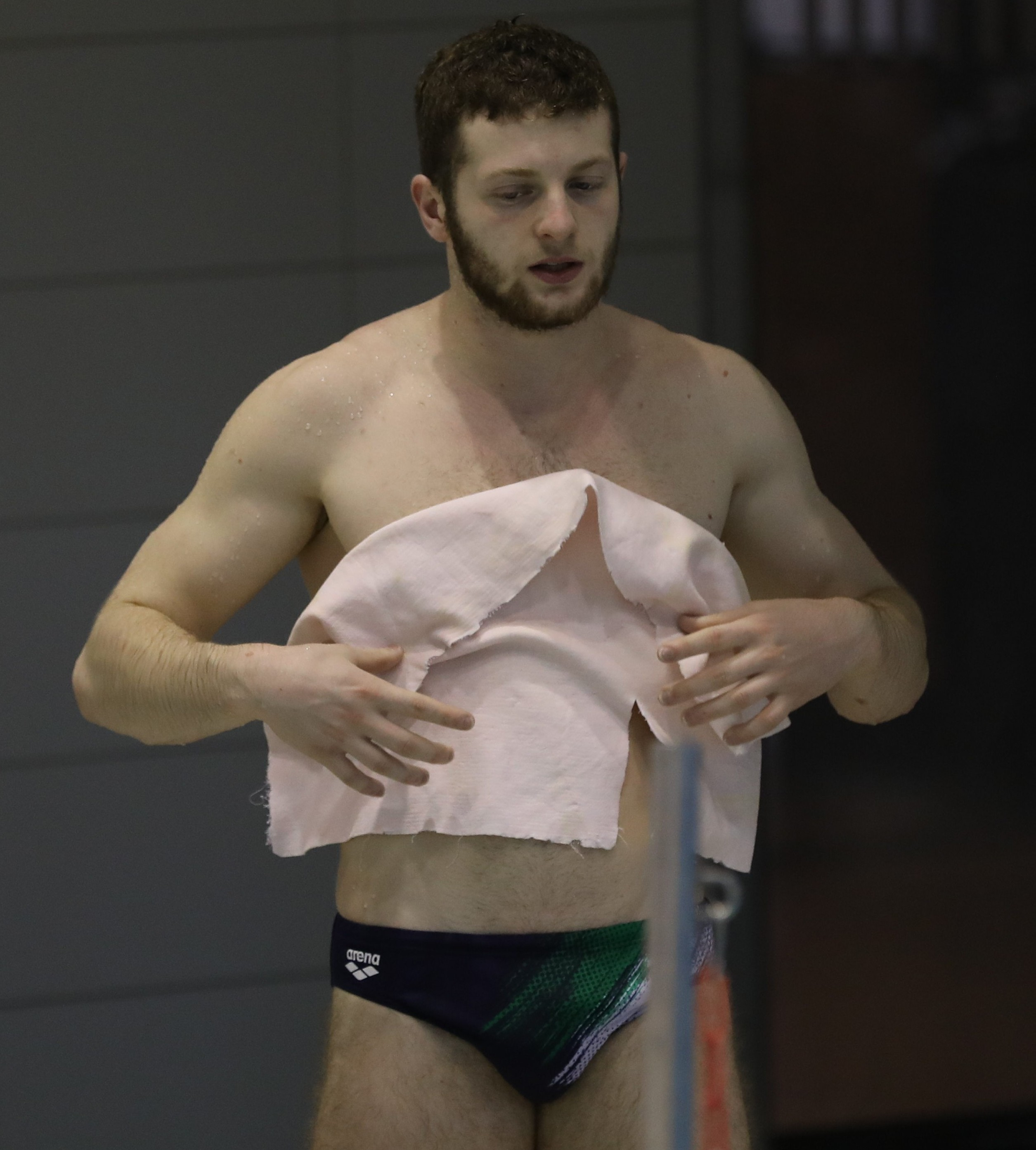

Personal information
- Nationality: Italian
- Born: 16 November 1996 (age 29) Rome, Italy

Sport
- Country: Italy
- Sport: Diving
- Event(s): 1 m springboard, 3 m synchro
- Club: G.S. Marina Militare
Medal record
Men's diving
Representing Italy
World Championships
Silver medal – second place	2024 Doha	3 m synchro
European Games
Silver medal – second place	2023 Kraków-Małopolska	3 m synchro
Silver medal – second place	2023 Kraków-Małopolska	Team
Bronze medal – third place	2023 Kraków-Małopolska	1 m springboard
European Championships
Gold medal – first place	2022 Rome	3 m springboard
Silver medal – second place	2022 Rome	1 m springboard
Silver medal – second place	2022 Rome	3 m synchro
European Diving Championships
Silver medal – second place	2023 Rzeszów	3 m synchro
Silver medal – second place	2023 Rzeszów	Team
Silver medal – second place	2025 Antalya	1 m springboard
Silver medal – second place	2025 Antalya	3 m synchro
Bronze medal – third place	2019 Kiev	1 m springboard
Bronze medal – third place	2023 Rzeszów	1 m springboard
Summer Universiade
Bronze medal – third place	2017 Taipei	3 m synchro

Lorenzo Marsaglia (born 16 November 1996 in Rome) is an Italian diver.

Marsaglia is an athlete of the Gruppo Sportivo della Marina Militare,

== Biography ==
He won the bronze medal at 1m springboard during 2019 European Diving Championships in Kiev.
