= Alexis Jandard =

French diver (born 1997)

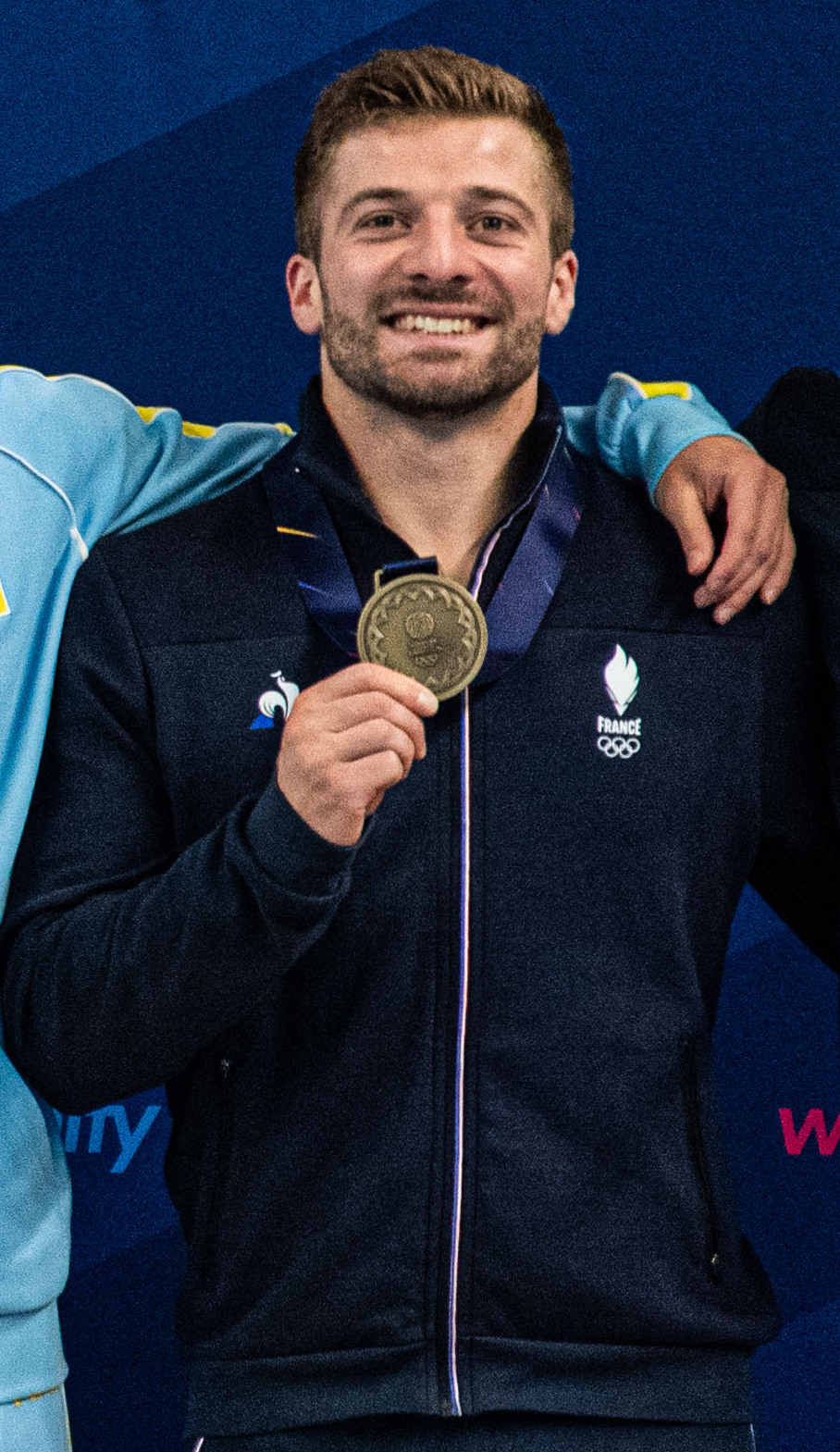
- Alexis Jandard at the 2023 European Games

Personal information
- Born: 23 April 1997 (age 29) Écully

Sport
- Country: France
- Sport: Diving
Medal record
Men's diving
Representing France
World Championships
Silver medal – second place	2022 Budapest	Team event
Bronze medal – third place	2023 Fukuoka	3 m synchro
European Games
Silver medal – second place	2023 Kraków-Małopolska	1 m springboard
Bronze medal – third place	2015 Baku	10 m platform
Bronze medal – third place	2023 Kraków-Małopolska	3 m springboard
Bronze medal – third place	2023 Kraków-Małopolska	3 m synchro
European Championships
Gold medal – first place	2024 Belgrade	3 m springboard synchro
European Diving Championships
Silver medal – second place	2023 Rzeszów	1 m springboard
Bronze medal – third place	2023 Rzeszów	3 m springboard
Bronze medal – third place	2023 Rzeszów	3 m synchro

Alexis Jandard (born 23 April 1997) is a French diver. He represented France at the World Aquatics Championships in 2015 and in 2019. He represented France at the 2020 Summer Olympics in Tokyo, Japan in the men's 3 metre springboard event.

In 2015, Jandard won the bronze medal in the men's 10 metre platform event at the European Games in Baku, Azerbaijan.

On 15 July 2023 at the 2023 World Aquatics Championships in Fukuoka, Jandard and Jules Bouyer won the bronze medal in the 3.4 metre synchronized event.
