= Diving at the 2020 European Aquatics Championships – Women's 3 m springboard =

Women's 3 m springboard at the 2020 European Aquatics Championships
- Venue: Danube Arena
- Dates: 15 May 2021
- Competitors: 28 from 19 nations
- Winning points: 330.85

Medalists
gold medal	Tina Punzel	Germany
silver medal	Chiara Pellacani	Italy
bronze medal	Emma Gullstrand	Sweden

The Women's 3 m springboard competition of the 2020 European Aquatics Championships was held on 15 May 2021.

== Results ==
The preliminary round was started at 12:00. The final was held at 18:10.

Green denotes finalists

Rank	Diver	Nationality	Preliminary		Final	
Rank	Diver	Nationality	Points	Rank	Points	Rank
1st place, gold medalist(s)	Tina Punzel	Germany	323.10	1	330.85	1
2nd place, silver medalist(s)	Chiara Pellacani	Italy	291.45	6	321.15	2
3rd place, bronze medalist(s)	Emma Gullstrand	Sweden	303.45	2	319.60	3
4	Vitaliia Koroleva	Russia	286.95	7	308.80	4
5	Michelle Heimberg	Switzerland	295.70	3	304.55	5
6	Maria Polyakova	Russia	273.45	10	289.80	6
7	Hanna Pysmenska	Ukraine	293.05	5	287.00	7
8	Scarlett Mew Jensen	Great Britain	294.60	4	281.25	8
9	Clare Cryan	Ireland	270.85	11	277.85	9
10	Inge Jansen	Netherlands	282.30	8	268.45	10
11	Lena Hentschel	Germany	261.60	12	264.25	11
12	Viktoriya Kesar	Ukraine	281.10	9	246.50	12
13	Emilia Nilsson Garip	Sweden	256.15	13	did not advance	
14	Madeline Coquoz	Switzerland	253.95	14	did not advance	
15	Alena Khamulkina	Belarus	253.55	15	did not advance	
16	Valeria Antolino	Spain	252.40	16	did not advance	
17	Grace Reid	Great Britain	251.10	17	did not advance	
18	Rocío Velázquez	Spain	245.10	18	did not advance	
19	Kaja Skrzek	Poland	244.00	19	did not advance	
20	Marcela Marić	Croatia	243.65	20	did not advance	
21	Elena Bertocchi	Italy	233.90	21	did not advance	
22	Naïs Gillet	France	228.60	22	did not advance	
23	Helle Tuxen	Norway	223.85	23	did not advance	
24	Laura Valore	Denmark	207.10	24	did not advance	
25	Zora Opalka	Slovakia	188.20	25	did not advance	
26	Patrícia Kun	Hungary	184.70	26	did not advance	
27	Emma Veisz	Hungary	178.25	27	did not advance	
28	Cara Albiez	Austria	171.65	28	did not advance	
