= 2019 European Diving Championships – Women's 3 metre springboard =

Sports event

The Women's 3 metre springboard event at the 2019 European Diving Championships was contested on 8 August.

== Results ==
22 athletes participated at the event; the best 12 from the Preliminary round qualified for the Final.

=== Preliminary round ===
Rank	Diver	Nationality	D1	D2	D3	D4	D5	Total
1	Kristina Ilinykh	Russia	56.70	63.55	58.50	48.00	63.00	289.75
2	Katherine Torrance	Great Britain	58.50	55.50	49.50	60.45	64.50	288.45
3	Michelle Heimberg	Switzerland	55.50	54.00	55.80	60.00	58.50	283.80
3	Inge Jansen	Netherlands	55.50	52.50	63.00	55.80	57.00	283.80
5	Tina Punzel	Germany	66.00	44.95	49.50	64.50	58.50	283.45
6	Viktoriya Kesar	Ukraine	61.50	54.00	61.50	36.00	65.10	278.10
7	Chiara Pellacani	Italy	63.00	52.50	51.15	51.00	54.00	271.65
8	Uliana Kliueva	Russia	60.00	60.45	58.50	31.50	58.50	268.95
9	Jessica Favre	Switzerland	61.50	60.45	51.00	42.00	46.50	261.45
10	Alena Khamulkina	Belarus	58.50	43.50	54.00	51.15	54.00	261.15
11	Emma Gullstrand	Sweden	48.00	55.80	43.50	46.50	58.50	252.30
12	Olena Fedorova	Ukraine	42.00	58.50	57.40	31.50	56.70	246.10
13	Clare Cryan	Ireland	49.95	58.90	43.40	43.40	42.00	237.65
14	Scarlett Mew Jensen	Great Britain	63.00	32.55	39.00	46.50	54.00	235.05
15	Emilia Nilsson Garip	Sweden	48.60	54.00	36.00	46.50	49.50	234.60
16	Lena Hentschel	Germany	58.50	43.50	45.00	46.50	40.50	234.00
17	Lauren Hallaselkä	Finland	35.10	40.60	57.40	42.00	46.80	221.90
18	Elena Bertocchi	Italy	58.50	45.00	41.85	24.00	48.60	217.95
19	Valeria Antolino Pacheco	Spain	55.35	30.80	40.60	44.80	45.00	216.55
20	Kaja Skrzek	Poland	50.40	36.00	50.40	26.60	42.00	205.40
21	Helle Tuxen	Norway	42.00	24.00	42.00	50.40	44.55	202.95
22	Nea Immonen	Finland	37.80	40.50	27.90	49.50	19.50	175.20

=== Final ===
Rank	Diver	Nationality	D1	D2	D3	D4	D5	Total
1st place, gold medalist(s)	Inge Jansen	Netherlands	58.50	67.50	63.00	41.85	63.00	293.85
2nd place, silver medalist(s)	Kristina Ilinykh	Russia	44.55	63.55	58.50	57.00	69.00	292.60
3rd place, bronze medalist(s)	Tina Punzel	Germany	55.50	66.65	37.50	67.50	63.00	290.15
4	Viktoriya Kesar	Ukraine	58.50	48.00	58.50	55.50	58.90	279.40
5	Michelle Heimberg	Switzerland	58.50	55.50	46.50	63.00	54.00	277.50
6	Chiara Pellacani	Italy	58.50	48.00	55.80	39.00	63.00	264.30
7	Emma Gullstrand	Sweden	39.00	55.80	45.00	57.00	54.00	250.80
8	Jessica Favre	Switzerland	55.50	57.35	40.50	45.00	51.00	249.35
9	Olena Fedorova	Ukraine	59.40	60.00	54.60	28.50	46.50	249.00
10	Katherine Torrance	Great Britain	48.00	45.00	40.50	55.80	55.50	244.80
11	Uliana Kliueva	Russia	54.00	41.85	45.00	46.50	57.00	244.35
12	Alena Khamulkina	Belarus	45.00	0.00	57.00	27.90	57.00	186.90
