= 2019 European Diving Championships – Women's 1 metre springboard =

Women's 1 metre springboard event at the 2019 European Diving Championships was contested on 10 August. The Russian Vitaliia Koroleva, ranked at the 13th place and eliminated after the preliminary round, entered the final due to the withdrawal of Italian Elena Bertocchi (8th in the preliminaries), and managed to win the gold medal.

== Results ==
23 athletes participated at the event; the best 12 from the preliminary round qualified for the final.

=== Preliminary round ===
Rank	Diver	Nationality	D1	D2	D3	D4	D5	Total
1	Kristina Ilinykh	Russia	54.00	48.30	57.20	57.20	49.50	266.20
2	Lena Hentschel	Germany	50.40	54.60	48.30	52.80	54.60	260.70
3	Katherine Torrance	Great Britain	50.40	48.30	43.20	54.60	55.90	252.40
4	Daphne Wils	Netherlands	50.40	36.40	50.60	67.50	41.25	246.15
5	Michelle Heimberg	Switzerland	50.40	48.10	48.30	44.40	50.70	241.90
6	Chiara Pellacani	Italy	44.85	50.70	43.20	50.70	48.00	237.45
7	Olena Fedorova	Ukraine	50.40	54.60	33.60	52.00	44.85	235.45
8	Elena Bertocchi	Italy	50.40	46.80	47.15	43.20	46.80	234.35
9	Clare Cryan	Ireland	50.40	44.85	44.40	46.80	46.80	233.25
10	Scarlett Mew Jensen	Great Britain	46.80	42.90	44.85	39.60	54.60	228.75
11	Valeria Antolino Pacheco	Spain	48.00	46.00	41.25	43.20	48.10	226.55
12	Alena Khamulkina	Belarus	46.80	49.40	44.85	40.80	44.20	226.05
13	Vitaliia Koroleva	Russia	45.60	41.60	40.25	54.00	44.20	225.65
14	Kaja Skrzek	Poland	50.40	46.80	37.95	43.20	46.20	224.55
15	Emilia Nilsson Garip	Sweden	50.40	45.60	46.00	31.20	48.10	221.30
16	Emma Gullstrand	Sweden	49.20	33.35	28.80	46.80	54.60	212.75
17	Jette Müller	Germany	37.70	44.40	48.00	46.80	21.85	198.75
18	Jessica Favre	Switzerland	51.60	20.80	28.75	43.20	53.30	197.65
19	Lauren Hallaselkä	Finland	50.40	37.95	39.60	35.10	33.00	196.05
20	Marcela Marić	Croatia	46.80	37.40	26.00	43.20	42.55	195.95
21	Anna Arnautova	Ukraine	45.60	31.20	36.80	33.60	46.20	193.40
22	Aleksandra Błażowska	Poland	43.20	36.30	43.70	25.20	40.30	188.70
23	Roosa Kanerva	Finland	40.25	32.40	43.20	36.40	24.70	176.95

=== Final ===
Rank	Diver	Nationality	D1	D2	D3	D4	D5	Total
1st place, gold medalist(s)	Vitaliia Koroleva	Russia	51.60	54.60	50.60	54.00	55.90	266.70
2nd place, silver medalist(s)	Olena Fedorova	Ukraine	54.00	57.20	52.80	54.60	44.85	263.45
3rd place, bronze medalist(s)	Kristina Ilinykh	Russia	56.40	51.75	55.90	58.50	40.50	263.03
4	Lena Hentschel	Germany	54.00	50.70	46.00	48.00	58.50	257.20
5	Chiara Pellacani	Italy	48.30	58.50	50.40	48.10	51.60	256.90
6	Katherine Torrance	Great Britain	50.40	48.30	48.00	45.50	57.20	249.40
7	Michelle Heimberg	Switzerland	51.60	54.60	51.75	38.40	50.70	247.05
8	Valeria Pacheco Antolino	Spain	50.40	48.30	45.00	49.20	50.70	243.60
9	Daphne Wils	Netherlands	52.80	54.60	47.15	39.00	45.00	238.55
10	Scarlett Mew Jensen	Great Britain	49.20	46.20	41.40	46.80	54.60	238.20
11	Alena Khamulkina	Belarus	46.80	46.80	49.45	40.80	46.80	230.65
12	Clare Cryan	Ireland	50.40	44.85	39.60	32.50	46.80	214.15
