= Diving at the 2016 European Aquatics Championships – Women's 1 m springboard =

Women's 1 m springboard at the 2016 European Aquatics Championships
- Dates: 11 May
- Competitors: 25 from 15 nations
- Winning points: 284.15

Medalists
gold medal	Tania Cagnotto	Italy
silver medal	Elena Bertocchi	Italy
bronze medal	Nadezhda Bazhina	Russia

The Women's 1 m springboard competition of the 2016 European Aquatics Championships was held on 11 May 2016.

== Results ==
The preliminary round was held at 12:00. The final was held at 20:00.

Green denotes finalists

Rank	Diver	Nationality	Preliminary		Final	
Rank	Diver	Nationality	Points	Rank	Points	Rank
1st place, gold medalist(s)	Tania Cagnotto	Italy	283.55	1	284.15	1
2nd place, silver medalist(s)	Elena Bertocchi	Italy	259.40	3	281.30	2
3rd place, bronze medalist(s)	Nadezhda Bazhina	Russia	272.70	2	280.75	3
4	Kristina Ilinykh	Russia	248.50	9	276.10	4
5	Uschi Freitag	Netherlands	254.10	5	265.35	5
6	Louisa Stawczynski	Germany	245.15	11	263.90	6
7	Grace Reid	Great Britain	249.25	8	262.25	7
8	Olena Fedorova	Ukraine	258.75	4	246.40	8
9	Hanna Pysmenska	Ukraine	247.60	10	245.15	9
10	Kaja Skrzek	Poland	244.80	12	241.45	10
11	Daniella Nero	Sweden	249.35	7	224.85	11
12	Katherine Torrance	Great Britain	250.95	6	216.20	12
13	Inge Jansen	Netherlands	237.95	13		
14	Jessica Favre	Switzerland	232.80	14		
15	Marcela Marić	Croatia	225.50	15		
16	Iira Laatunen	Finland	223.15	16		
17	Frida Kallgren	Sweden	215.80	17		
18	Alena Khamulkina	Belarus	214.65	18		
19	Clara Della Vedova	France	211.95	19		
20	Vivian Barth	Switzerland	209.25	20		
21	Taina Karvonen	Finland	207.60	21		
22	Rocío Velázquez	Spain	202.05	22		
23	Maja Borić	Croatia	185.80	23		
24	Indrė Girdauskaitė	Lithuania	179.25	24		
