= Diving at the 2018 European Aquatics Championships – Women's 3 m springboard =

Women's 3 m springboard at the 2018 European Aquatics Championships
- Venue: Royal Commonwealth Pool
- Dates: 11 August
- Competitors: 21 from 14 nations
- Winning points: 329.40

Medalists
gold medal	Grace Reid	Great Britain
silver medal	Alicia Blagg	Great Britain
bronze medal	Tina Punzel	Germany

The Women's 3 m springboard competition of the 2018 European Aquatics Championships was held on 11 August 2018.

== Results ==
The preliminary round was started at 09:30. The final was held at 17:00.

Green denotes finalists

Rank	Diver	Nationality	Preliminary		Final	
Rank	Diver	Nationality	Points	Rank	Points	Rank
1st place, gold medalist(s)	Grace Reid	Great Britain	315.70	2	329.40	1
2nd place, silver medalist(s)	Alicia Blagg	Great Britain	294.45	4	327.70	2
3rd place, bronze medalist(s)	Tina Punzel	Germany	290.05	6	324.65	3
4	Viktoriya Kesar	Ukraine	297.45	3	282.60	4
5	Michelle Heimberg	Switzerland	269.30	9	274.20	5
5	Nadezhda Bazhina	Russia	293.40	5	274.20	5
7	Chiara Pellacani	Italy	278.50	7	274.00	7
8	Kaja Skrzek	Poland	239.45	12	261.35	8
9	Hanna Pysmenska	Ukraine	277.65	8	259.30	9
10	Alena Khamulkina	Belarus	256.10	10	258.00	10
11	Mariia Poliakova	Russia	318.65	1	256.45	11
12	Elena Bertocchi	Italy	253.90	11	255.55	12
13	Daniella Nero	Sweden	234.50	13	did not advance	
14	Lena Hentschel	Germany	233.55	14	did not advance	
15	Inge Jansen	Netherlands	231.20	15	did not advance	
16	Lauren Hallaselkä	Finland	227.00	16	did not advance	
17	Selina Staudenherz	Austria	213.25	17	did not advance	
18	Jessica Favre	Switzerland	206.95	18	did not advance	
19	Genevieve Green	Lithuania	198.70	19	did not advance	
20	Indrė Girdauskaitė	Lithuania	191.80	20	did not advance	
21	Helle Tuxen	Norway	170.65	21	did not advance	
