= 2017 European Diving Championships – Women's 1 metre springboard =

== Results ==
Green denotes finalists

Rank	Diver	Nationality	Preliminary		Final	
Rank	Diver	Nationality	Points	Rank	Points	Rank
1st place, gold medalist(s)	Elena Bertocchi	Italy	261.80	1	282.80	1
2nd place, silver medalist(s)	Nadezhda Bazhina	Russia	255.30	2	277.35	2
3rd place, bronze medalist(s)	Louisa Stawczynski	Germany	247.20	5	271.80	3
4	Hanna Pysmenska	Ukraine	250.45	3	262.65	4
5	Tina Punzel	Germany	240.45	7	259.05	5
6	Michelle Heimberg	Switzerland	245.85	6	256.65	6
7	Vitaliia Koroleva	Russia	238.25	9	248.15	7
8	Roosa Kanerva	Finland	225.10	12	242.40	8
9	Alena Khamulkina	Belarus	250.15	4	238.60	9
10	Chiara Pellacani	Italy	229.00	10	234.85	10
11	Kaja Skrzek	Poland	228.50	11	231.65	11
12	Inge Jansen	Netherlands	238.75	8	229.85	12
13	Daniella Nero	Sweden	211.35	13		
14	Marcela Marić	Croatia	210.70	14		
15	Frida Källgren	Sweden	208.95	15		
16	Diana Shelestyuk	Ukraine	206.10	16		
17	Vivian Barth	Switzerland	203.95	17		
18	Anca Şerb	Romania	195.60	18		
19	Daphne Wils	Netherlands	191.20	19		
20	Indrė Marija Girdauskaitė	Lithuania	179.45	20		
