= Diving at the 2019 World Aquatics Championships – Mixed synchronized 3 metre springboard =

Mixed synchronized 3 metre springboard at the 2019 World Aquatics Championships
- Venue: Nambu University Municipal Aquatics Center
- Location: Gwangju, South Korea
- Dates: 20 July
- Competitors: 36 from 18 nations
- Teams: 18
- Winning points: 304.86

Medalists
| gold medal | Matthew Carter; Maddison Keeney | Australia |
| silver medal | François Imbeau-Dulac; Jennifer Abel | Canada |
| bronze medal | Lou Massenberg; Tina Punzel | Germany |

The Mixed synchronized 3 metre springboard competition at the 2019 World Aquatics Championships was held on 20 July 2019.

== Results ==
The final was started at 15:30.

| Rank | Nation | Divers | Points |
|---|---|---|---|
| 1st place, gold medalist(s) | Australia | Matthew Carter; Maddison Keeney | 304.86 |
| 2nd place, silver medalist(s) | Canada | François Imbeau-Dulac; Jennifer Abel | 304.08 |
| 3rd place, bronze medalist(s) | Germany | Lou Massenberg; Tina Punzel | 301.62 |
| 4 | Great Britain | Tom Daley; Grace Reid | 298.47 |
| 5 | United States | Briadam Herrera; Maria Coburn | 295.95 |
| 6 | Mexico | Osmar Oliveira; Dolores Hernández | 288.30 |
| 7 | Ukraine | Stanislav Oliferchyk; Viktoriya Kesar | 282.84 |
| 8 | Colombia | Sebastián Villa; Diana Pineda | 279.87 |
| 9 | New Zealand | Anton Down-Jenkins; Elizabeth Cui | 274.80 |
| 10 | Russia | Sergey Nazin; Kristina Ilinykh | 273.24 |
| 11 | Malaysia | Muhammad Puteh; Nur Dhabitah Sabri | 271.29 |
| 12 | Ireland | Oliver Dingley; Clare Cryan | 266.49 |
| 13 | Italy | Maicol Verzotto; Elena Bertocchi | 261.60 |
| 14 | Sweden | Vinko Paradzik; Emma Gullstrand | 253.62 |
| 15 | South Korea | Kim Ji-wook; Kim Su-ji | 249.90 |
| 16 | Brazil | Luis Moura; Tammy Takagi | 249.30 |
| 17 | Chile | Donato Neglia; Alison Maillard | 242.64 |
| 18 | Egypt | Mohab Ishak; Maha Eissa | 112.50 |
