= Diving at the 2019 World Aquatics Championships – Women's 3 metre springboard =

Women's 3 metre springboard at the 2019 World Aquatics Championships
- Venue: Nambu University Municipal Aquatics Center
- Location: Gwangju, South Korea
- Dates: 18–19 July
- Competitors: 51 from 32 nations

Medalists
gold medal	Shi Tingmao	China
silver medal	Wang Han	China
bronze medal	Maddison Keeney	Australia

The Women's 3 metre springboard competition at the 2019 World Aquatics Championships was held on 18 and 19 July 2019.

== Results ==
The preliminary round was started on 18 July at 10:00. The semifinal was held on 18 July at 15:30. The final was started on 19 July at 20:45.

Green denotes finalists

Blue denotes semifinalists

Rank	Diver	Nationality	Preliminary		Semifinal		Final	
Rank	Diver	Nationality	Points	Rank	Points	Rank	Points	Rank
1st place, gold medalist(s)	Shi Tingmao	China	357.90	1	359.40	1	391.00	1
2nd place, silver medalist(s)	Wang Han	China	356.40	2	345.80	3	372.85	2
3rd place, bronze medalist(s)	Maddison Keeney	Australia	341.00	3	348.10	2	367.05	3
4	Jennifer Abel	Canada	318.75	4	339.90	4	333.35	4
5	Sayaka Mikami	Japan	291.60	8	307.95	7	323.05	5
6	Esther Qin	Australia	272.10	15	286.40	12	302.85	6
7	Pamela Ware	Canada	307.95	5	308.00	6	290.20	7
8	Grace Reid	Great Britain	277.95	13	300.75	8	286.95	8
9	Ng Yan Yee	Malaysia	279.30	12	288.60	10	282.40	9
10	Tina Punzel	Germany	293.05	7	309.40	5	281.00	10
11	Viktoriya Kesar	Ukraine	258.60	18	300.25	9	276.45	11
12	Inge Jansen	Netherlands	288.15	10	286.80	11	268.20	12
13	Elizabeth Cui	New Zealand	273.90	14	284.10	13	did not advance	
14	Sarah Bacon	United States	295.95	6	282.65	14	did not advance	
15	Olena Fedorova	Ukraine	288.00	11	279.10	15	did not advance	
16	Julia Vincent	South Africa	268.30	16	275.85	16	did not advance	
17	Chiara Pellacani	Italy	290.00	9	275.10	17	did not advance	
18	Elena Chernykh	Russia	266.70	17	264.45	18	did not advance	
19	Emma Gullstrand	Sweden	258.10	19	Did not advance			
20	Jessica Favre	Switzerland	258.00	20	Did not advance			
21	Kim Su-ji	South Korea	256.95	21	Did not advance			
22	Uliana Kliueva	Russia	251.70	22	Did not advance			
23	Clare Cryan	Ireland	250.25	23	Did not advance			
24	Paola Espinosa	Mexico	250.15	24	Did not advance			
25	Nur Dhabitah Sabri	Malaysia	249.05	25	Did not advance			
26	Scarlett Mew Jensen	Great Britain	247.90	26	Did not advance			
27	Alena Khamulkina	Belarus	246.95	27	Did not advance			
28	Michelle Heimberg	Switzerland	241.65	28	Did not advance			
29	Brooke Schultz	United States	241.45	29	Did not advance			
30	Dolores Hernández	Mexico	240.90	30	Did not advance			
31	Diana Pineda	Colombia	239.45	31	Did not advance			
32	Lena Hentschel	Germany	238.10	32	Did not advance			
33	Viviana Uribe	Colombia	235.90	33	Did not advance			
34	Elena Bertocchi	Italy	235.45	34	Did not advance			
35	Micaela Bouter	South Africa	233.15	35	Did not advance			
36	Helle Tuxen	Norway	229.40	36	Did not advance			
37	Kaja Skrzek	Poland	226.80	37	Did not advance			
38	Nea Immonen	Finland	225.75	38	Did not advance			
39	Ashlee Tan	Singapore	221.45	39	Did not advance			
40	Cho Eun-bi	South Korea	221.15	40	Did not advance			
41	Luana Lira	Brazil	220.20	41	Did not advance			
42	Maha Eissa	Egypt	217.70	42	Did not advance			
43	Juliana Veloso	Brazil	206.70	43	Did not advance			
44	Marcela Marić	Croatia	197.05	44	Did not advance			
45	Alison Maillard	Chile	190.25	45	Did not advance			
46	Shaye Boddington	New Zealand	176.85	46	Did not advance			
47	Emilia Nilsson	Sweden	176.60	47	Did not advance			
48	Indrė Girdauskaitė	Lithuania	157.05	48	Did not advance			
49	Chan Lam	Hong Kong	150.75	49	Did not advance			
50	Maha Abdelsalam	Egypt	133.75	50	Did not advance			
51	Lei Meng Hin	Macau	94.00	51	Did not advance			
