= 2017 European Diving Championships – Women's 3 metre synchro springboard =

== Results ==
Rank	Diver	Nationality	Final	
Rank	Diver	Nationality	Points	Rank
1st place, gold medalist(s)	Nadezhda Bazhina; Kristina Ilinykh	Russia	304.80	1
2nd place, silver medalist(s)	Tina Punzel; Friederike Freyer	Germany	284.10	2
3rd place, bronze medalist(s)	Inge Jansen; Daphne Wils	Netherlands	283.80	3
4	Katherine Torrance; Grace Reid	United Kingdom	283.50	4
5	Anna Pysmenska; Viktoriya Kesar	Ukraine	272.40	5
6	Emma G-Gullstrand; Daniella Nero	Sweden	255.42	6
7	Villo Gyongyver Kormos; Flora P. Fazekas-Gondos	Hungary	237.75	7
8	Vivian Barth; Jessica Favre	Switzerland	231.18	8
