= 2019 European Diving Championships – Mixed 3 m springboard synchro =

Mixed 3 m springboard synchro event at the 2019 European Diving Championships was contested on 6 August.

== Results ==
Eight pairs of athletes participated at the single-round event.

Rank	Divers	Nationality	D1	D2	D3	D4	D5	Total
1st place, gold medalist(s)	Viktoriya Kesar; Stanislav Oliferchyk	Ukraine	48.00	46.80	65.70	69.30	67.89	297.69
2nd place, silver medalist(s)	Tina Punzel; Lou Massenberg	Germany	48.00	46.80	65.70	67.89	65.70	294.09
3rd place, bronze medalist(s)	Michelle Heimberg; Jonathan Suckow	Switzerland	43.80	43.80	64.80	63.90	65.70	282.00
4	Elena Bertocchi; Maicol Verzotto	Italy	48.60	43.20	63.90	59.52	59.40	274.62
5	Uliana Kliueva; Ruslan Ternovoi	Russia	46.20	41.40	57.60	62.10	63.90	271.20
6	Scarlett Mew Jensen; Matthew Dixon	Great Britain	44.40	43.80	48.60	60.45	60.30	257.55
7	Alena Khamulkina; Artsiom Barouski	Belarus	42.60	43.80	60.30	58.59	45.90	251.19
8	Clare Cryan; Oliver Dingley	Ireland	44.40	45.00	58.50	49.56	44.64	242.10
