= Diving at the 2020 European Aquatics Championships – Women's 3 m synchro springboard =

Women's 3 m springboard synchro at the 2020 European Aquatics Championships
- Venue: Danube Arena
- Dates: 16 May 2021
- Competitors: 12 from 6 nations
- Teams: 6
- Winning points: 307.29

Medalists
gold medal	Lena Hentschel; Tina Punzel	Germany
silver medal	Elena Bertocchi; Chiara Pellacani	Italy
bronze medal	Uliana Kliueva; Vitaliia Koroleva	Russia

The Women's 3 m synchro springboard competition of the 2020 European Aquatics Championships was held on 16 May 2021.

== Results ==
The final was started at 18:00.

Rank	Nation	Divers	Points					
Rank	Nation	Divers	T1	T2	T3	T4	T5	Total
1st place, gold medalist(s)	Germany	Lena Hentschel; Tina Punzel	48.60	48.60	70.20	72.00	67.89	307.29
2nd place, silver medalist(s)	Italy	Elena Bertocchi; Chiara Pellacani	49.80	44.40	72.00	74.40	66.60	307.20
3rd place, bronze medalist(s)	Russia	Uliana Kliueva; Vitaliia Koroleva	48.60	49.80	69.30	54.90	68.40	291.00
4	Great Britain	Grace Reid; Katherine Torrance	49.80	47.40	67.50	63.00	63.00	290.70
5	Ukraine	Hanna Pysmenska; Viktoriya Kesar	48.60	46.20	65.70	58.59	62.10	281.19
6	Hungary	Petra Sándor; Emma Veisz	43.80	37.80	46.80	43.74	47.04	219.18
