= 2019 European Diving Championships – Women's 3 metre synchro springboard =

The women's 3 metre synchro springboard event at the 2019 European Diving Championships was contested on 11 August.

== Results ==
Seven pairs of athletes participated at the single-round event.

Rank	Divers	Nationality	D1	D2	D3	D4	D5	Total
1st place, gold medalist(s)	Uliana Kliueva; Vitaliia Koroleva	Russia	48.00	49.20	62.10	63.90	67.50	290.70
2nd place, silver medalist(s)	Lena Hentschel; Tina Punzel	Germany	49.80	48.00	64.80	64.17	62.10	288.87
3rd place, bronze medalist(s)	Viktoriya Kesar; Anna Pysmenska	Ukraine	45.00	46.80	63.00	64.17	68.40	287.37
4	Scarlett Mew Jensen; Maria Papworth	Great Britain	47.40	46.80	61.20	62.31	60.30	278.01
5	Inge Jansen; Celine van Duijn	Netherlands	41.40	45.60	59.40	62.10	56.70	265.30
6	Madeline Coquoz; Jessica Favre	Switzerland	39.00	40.80	63.00	54.87	55.80	253.47
7	Anne Vilde Tuxen; Helle Tuxen	Norway	43.20	42.60	56.28	0.00	49.41	191.49
