= Diving at the 2019 World Aquatics Championships – Women's 1 metre springboard =

Women's 1 metre springboard at the 2019 World Aquatics Championships
- Venue: Nambu University Municipal Aquatics Center
- Location: Gwangju, South Korea
- Dates: 12–13 July
- Competitors: 43 from 28 nations
- Winning points: 285.45

Medalists
gold medal	Chen Yiwen	China
silver medal	Sarah Bacon	United States
bronze medal	Kim Su-ji	South Korea

The Women's 1 metre springboard competition at the 2019 World Aquatics Championships was held on 12 and 13 July 2019.

== Results ==
The preliminary round was started on 12 July at 15:30. The final was started on 13 July at 15:30.

Green denotes finalists

Rank	Diver	Nationality	Preliminary		Final	
Rank	Diver	Nationality	Points	Rank	Points	Rank
1st place, gold medalist(s)	Chen Yiwen	China	287.95	1	285.45	1
2nd place, silver medalist(s)	Sarah Bacon	United States	240.00	6	262.00	2
3rd place, bronze medalist(s)	Kim Su-ji	South Korea	238.95	8	257.20	3
4	Katherine Torrance	Great Britain	236.75	10	255.40	4
5	Kristina Ilinykh	Russia	245.50	3	252.80	5
6	Chang Yani	China	257.65	2	251.95	6
7	Elena Bertocchi	Italy	232.55	12	245.60	7
8	Elizabeth Cui	New Zealand	235.90	11	244.20	8
9	Georgia Sheehan	Australia	238.25	9	241.70	9
10	Maria Coburn	United States	239.70	7	237.75	10
11	Clare Cryan	Ireland	240.70	5	237.05	11
12	Julia Vincent	South Africa	241.35	4	236.40	12
13	Melany Hernández	Mexico	231.95	13	did not advance	
14	Emilia Nilsson	Sweden	231.50	14	did not advance	
15	Esther Qin	Australia	225.55	15	did not advance	
16	Michelle Heimberg	Switzerland	218.55	16	did not advance	
17	Kwon Ha-lim	South Korea	217.80	17	did not advance	
18	Aranza Vázquez	Mexico	217.50	18	did not advance	
19	Scarlett Mew Jensen	Great Britain	217.10	19	did not advance	
20	Olena Fedorova	Ukraine	215.65	20	did not advance	
21	Lena Hentschel	Germany	214.10	21	did not advance	
22	Anisley García	Cuba	213.25	22	did not advance	
23	Maria Polyakova	Russia	212.25	23	did not advance	
24	Anna Arnautova	Ukraine	210.70	24	did not advance	
25	Kaja Skrzek	Poland	210.25	25	did not advance	
26	Shaye Boddington	New Zealand	208.40	26	did not advance	
27	Alison Maillard	Chile	207.85	27	did not advance	
28	Maha Eissa	Egypt	206.70	28	did not advance	
29	Alena Khamulkina	Belarus	206.50	29	did not advance	
30	Lauren Hallaselkä	Finland	203.50	30	did not advance	
31	Diana Pineda	Colombia	202.80	31	did not advance	
32	Luana Lira	Brazil	202.35	32	did not advance	
33	Steffanie Madrigal	Colombia	201.90	33	did not advance	
34	Roosa Kanerva	Finland	199.90	34	did not advance	
35	Marcela Marić	Croatia	199.75	35	did not advance	
36	Emma Gullstrand	Sweden	194.00	36	did not advance	
37	Madeline Coquoz	Switzerland	187.75	37	did not advance	
38	Prisis Ruiz	Cuba	184.90	38	did not advance	
39	Choi Sut Kuan	Macau	157.65	39	did not advance	
40	Indrė Girdauskaitė	Lithuania	156.40	40	did not advance	
41	Chan Lam	Hong Kong	142.10	41	did not advance	
42	Kwanchanok Khunboonjan	Thailand	135.90	42	did not advance	
43	Danielle Robles	Brazil	124.65	43	did not advance	
