= Uliana Kliueva =

Russian diver

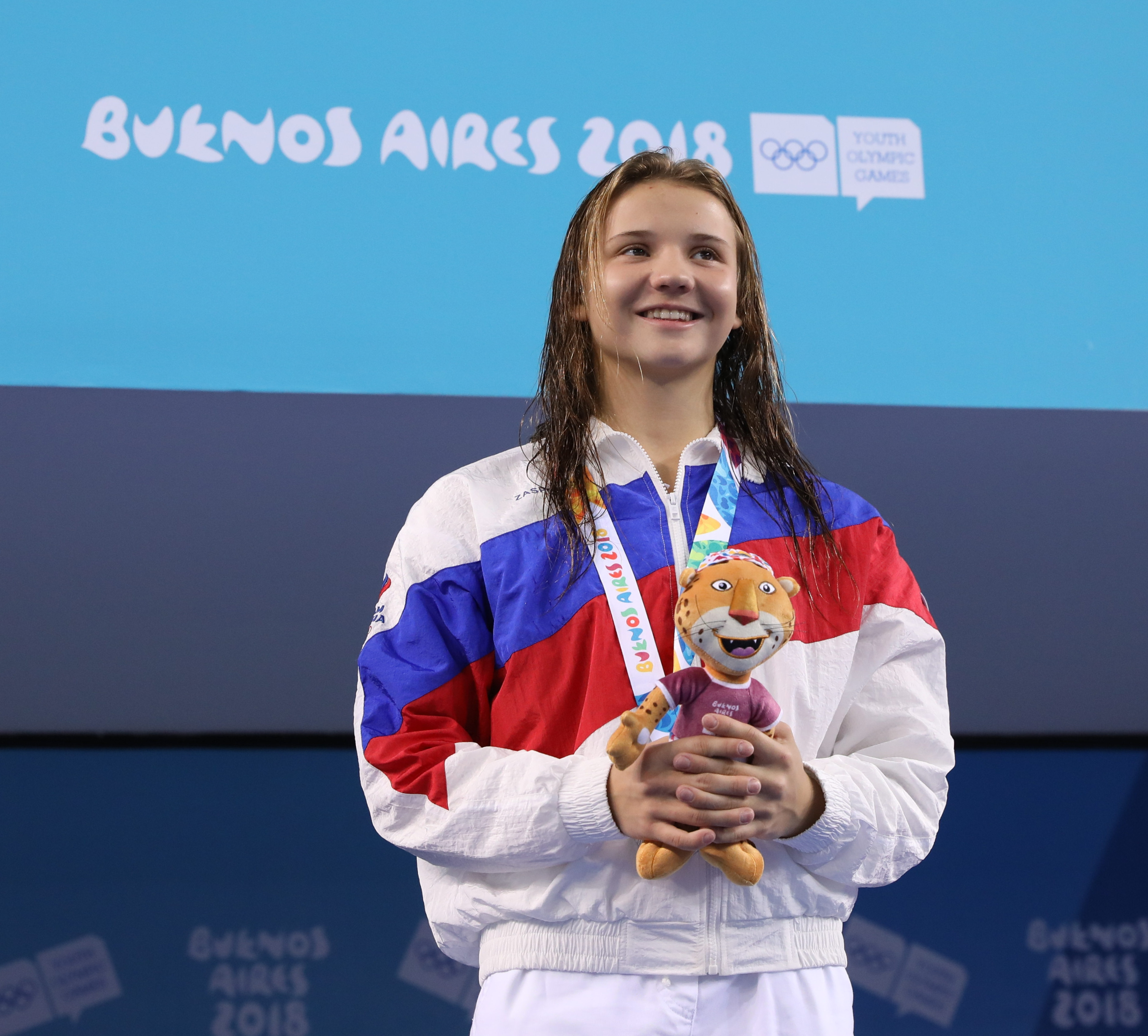
- Uliana Kliueva in 2018

Personal information
- Born: 30 June 2002 (age 24)

Sport
- Country: Russia
- Sport: Diving
Medal record
Women's diving
Representing Russia
European Diving Championships
Gold medal – first place	2019 Kyiv	3 m synchro
European Aquatics Championships
Bronze medal – third place	2020 Budapest	3 m synchro
Summer Youth Olympics
Silver medal – second place	2018 Buenos Aires	3 m springboard

Uliana Kliueva (born 30 June 2002) is a Russian diver. She competed in the women's 3 metre springboard event at the 2019 World Aquatics Championships in Gwangju, South Korea. She finished in 22nd place in the preliminary round.

In 2018, she won the silver medal in the girls' 3m springboard event at the Summer Youth Olympics held in Buenos Aires, Argentina. She also competed in the mixed team event. In 2019, Kliueva and Vitaliia Koroleva won the gold medal in the women's 3 metre synchro springboard at the 2019 European Diving Championships held in Kyiv, Ukraine. Kliueva and Ruslan Ternovoi finished in 5th place in the mixed 3 m springboard synchro event. In the women's 3 metre springboard event she finished in 11th place.

In 2021, Kliueva and Vitaliia Koroleva won the bronze medal in the women's 3 m synchro springboard event at the 2020 European Aquatics Championships held in Budapest, Hungary.
