= Shaye Boddington =

New Zealand diver (born 1986)

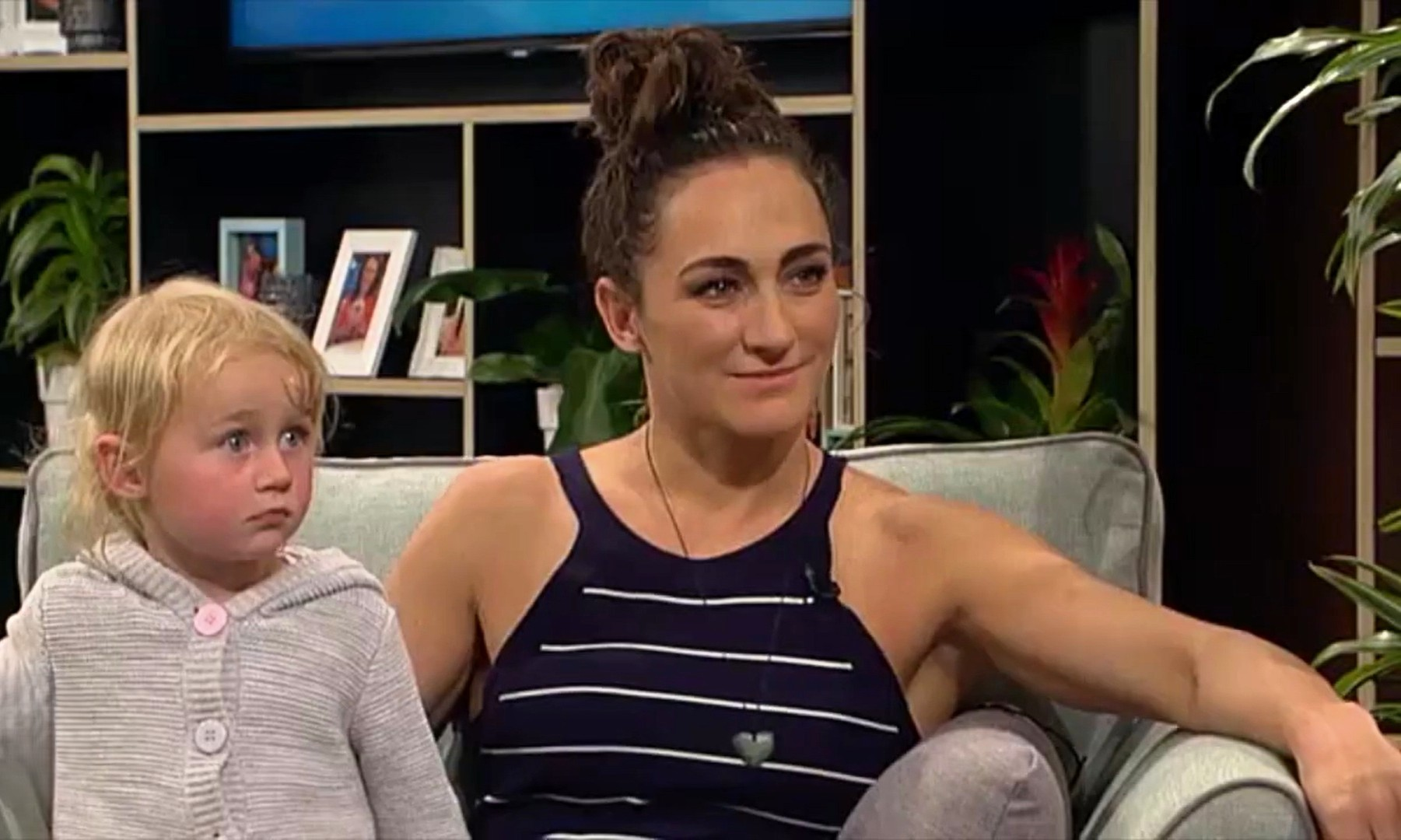
- Boddington and daughter in 2017

Personal information
- Nationality: New Zealand
- Born: 20 April 1986 (age 40)

Sport
- Sport: Diving

Shaye Boddington (born 20 April 1986) is a New Zealand diver. She competed in the women's 1 metre springboard event at the 2019 World Aquatics Championships. She finished in 26th place in the preliminary round. In the women's 3 metre springboard event she finished in 46th place in the preliminary round.
