= 2017 European Diving Championships – Mixed 3 m springboard synchro =

== Results ==
Rank	Diver	Nationality	Final	
Rank	Diver	Nationality	Points	Rank
1st place, gold medalist(s)	Elena Bertocchi; Maicol Verzotto	Italy	287.88	1
2nd place, silver medalist(s)	Viktoriya Kesar; Stanislav Oliferchyk	Ukraine	282.96	2
3rd place, bronze medalist(s)	Tina Punzel; Lou Massenberg	Germany	281.40	3
4	Ekaterina Nekrasova; Ilia Molchanov	Russia	280.71	4
5	Michelle Heimberg; Jonathan Suckow	Switzerland	263.10	5
6	Daniella Nero; Vinko Paradzik	Sweden	233.37	6
