= Colombia at the 2019 World Aquatics Championships =

- Flag of Colombia
- FINA code: COL
- National federation: Federación Colombiana de Natación
- Website: fecna.com.co

in Gwangju, South Korea
- Competitors: 21 in 4 sports
- Medals: Gold 0 Silver 0 Bronze 0 Total 0

World Aquatics Championships appearances
- 1973; 1975; 1978; 1982; 1986; 1991; 1994; 1998; 2001; 2003; 2005; 2007; 2009; 2011; 2013; 2015; 2017; 2019; 2022; 2023; 2024

Colombia competed at the 2019 World Aquatics Championships in Gwangju, South Korea from 12 to 28 July.

== Artistic swimming ==
Colombia's artistic swimming team consisted of 4 athletes (3 female and 1 male).

Women

Athlete	Event	Preliminaries		Final	
Athlete	Event	Points	Rank	Points	Rank
Mónica Arango	Solo technical routine	78.8804	13	did not advance	
Mónica Arango	Solo free routine	78.4000	18	did not advance	
Estefanía Álvarez; Mónica Arango	Duet technical routine	79.1640	21	did not advance	
Estefanía Álvarez; Mónica Arango	Duet free routine	79.0333	20	did not advance	

Mixed

Athlete	Event	Preliminaries		Final	
Athlete	Event	Points	Rank	Points	Rank
Jennifer Cerquera; Gustavo Sánchez	Duet technical routine	76.1453	8 Q	77.5388	8
Jennifer Cerquera; Gustavo Sánchez	Duet free routine	78.5667	8 Q	78.7000	8

== Diving ==
Colombia entered eight divers.

Men

Athlete	Event	Preliminaries		Semifinals		Final	
Athlete	Event	Points	Rank	Points	Rank	Points	Rank
Sebastián Morales	1 m springboard	295.10	31	—		did not advance	
Sebastián Morales	3 m springboard	399.50	17 Q	448.45	7 Q	433.50	11
Daniel Restrepo	1 m springboard	328.05	18	—		did not advance	
Daniel Restrepo	3 m springboard	404.95	15 Q	413.95	14	did not advance	
Víctor Ortega	10 m platform	339.05	27	did not advance			
Sebastián Villa	10 m platform	381.35	19	did not advance			
Sebastián Morales; Daniel Restrepo	3 m synchronized springboard	367.44	8 Q	—		381.36	9

Women

Athlete	Event	Preliminaries		Semifinals		Final	
Athlete	Event	Points	Rank	Points	Rank	Points	Rank
Steffanie Madrigal	1 m springboard	201.90	33	—		did not advance	
Diana Pineda	1 m springboard	202.80	31	—		did not advance	
Diana Pineda	3 m springboard	239.45	31	did not advance			
Viviana Uribe	3 m springboard	235.90	33	did not advance			
Viviana Uribe	10 m platform	201.90	34	did not advance			
Valentina Quintero	10 m platform	151.50	38	did not advance			
Steffanie Madrigal; Diana Pineda	3 m synchronized springboard	234.42	18	—		did not advance	

Mixed

Athlete	Event	Final	
Athlete	Event	Points	Rank
Sebastián Villa; Diana Pineda	3 m synchronized springboard	279.87	8
Sebastián Villa; Diana Pineda	Team	325.40	7

== High diving ==
Colombia qualified two male and one female high divers.

Men

Athlete	Event	Points	Rank
Orlando Duque	Men's high diving	355.20	9
Miguel García	Men's high diving	365.80	7

Women

Athlete	Event	Points	Rank
María Quintero	Women's high diving	246.80	7

== Swimming ==
Colombia has entered six swimmers.

Men

Athlete	Event	Heat		Semifinal		Final	
Athlete	Event	Time	Rank	Time	Rank	Time	Rank
Carlos Mahecha	200 m breaststroke	2:15.68	40	did not advance			
Jorge Murillo	50 m breaststroke	28.36	40	did not advance			
Jorge Murillo	100 m breaststroke	1:01.45	33	did not advance			
Omar Pinzón	100 m backstroke	56.37	44	did not advance			
Omar Pinzón	200 m backstroke	2:04.76	36	did not advance			

Women

Athlete	Event	Heat		Semifinal		Final	
Athlete	Event	Time	Rank	Time	Rank	Time	Rank
María Álvarez	200 m freestyle	2:05.28	35	did not advance			
María Álvarez	400 m freestyle	4:22.46	33	—		did not advance	
Isabella Arcila	100 m backstroke	1:04.07	45	did not advance			
Sirena Rowe	100 m freestyle	57.42	45	did not advance			
Sirena Rowe	50 m butterfly	27.02	31	did not advance			
