= Diving at the 2018 Summer Youth Olympics – Girls' 3m springboard =

Girls' 3m springboard at the III Summer Youth Olympic Games
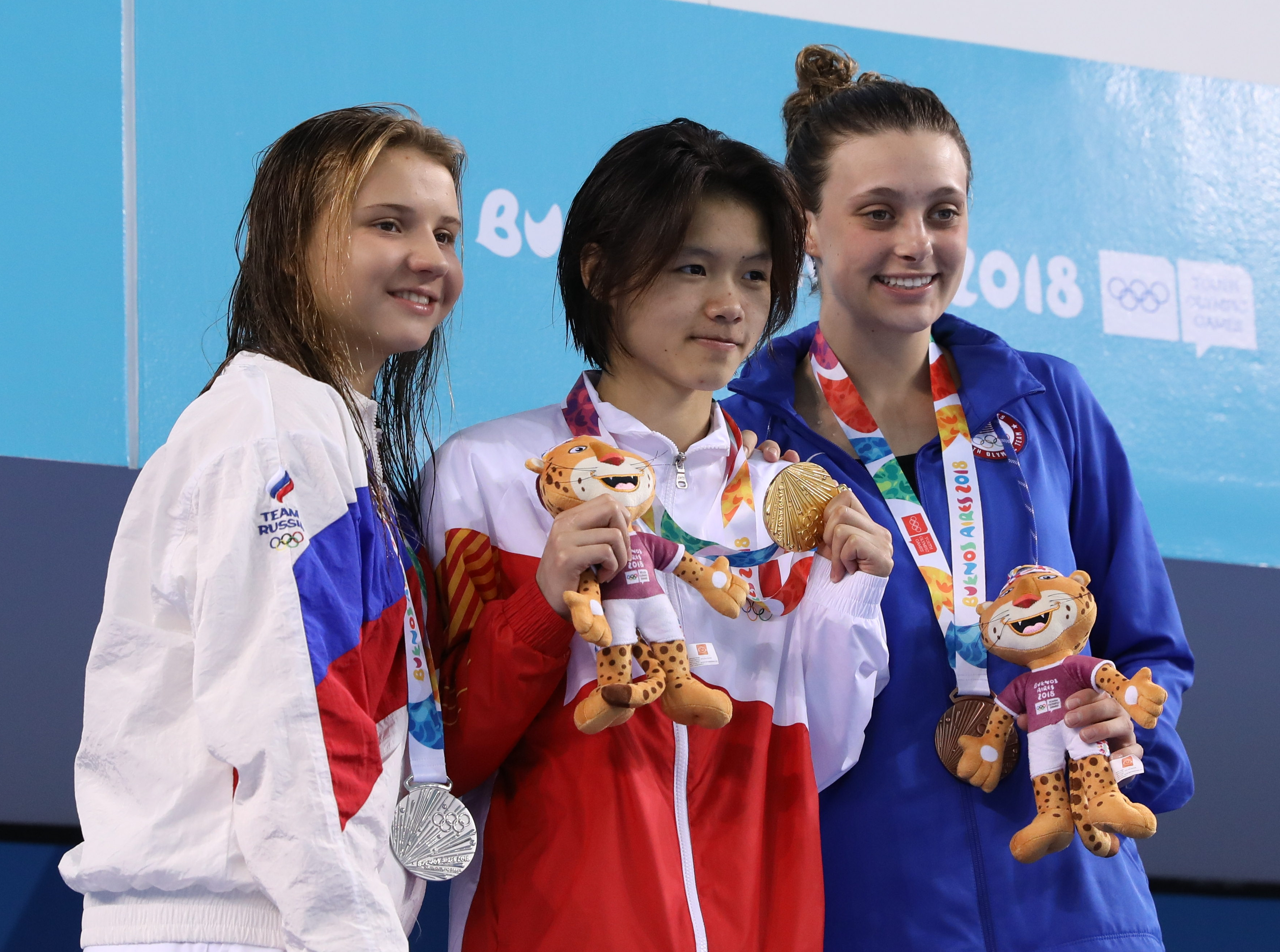
- Medailists
- Venue: Natatorium
- Dates: 15 October
- Competitors: 15 from 15 nations

Medalists
1st place, gold medalist(s)		Lin Shan	China
2nd place, silver medalist(s)		Uliana Kliueva	Russia
3rd place, bronze medalist(s)		Bridget O'Neil	United States

These are the results for the girls' 3m springboard event at the 2018 Summer Youth Olympics.

== Results ==
Rank	Diver	Nation	Preliminary		Final	
Rank	Diver	Nation	Points	Rank	Points	Rank
1st place, gold medalist(s)	Lin Shan	China	506.80	1	505.50	1
2nd place, silver medalist(s)	Uliana Kliueva	Russia	442.05	2	445.05	2
3rd place, bronze medalist(s)	Bridget O'Neil	United States	414.60	5	439.60	3
4	Maria Papworth	Great Britain	369.85	12	428.95	4
5	Gabriela Agundes	Mexico	408.20	6	427.70	5
6	Kimberly Bong	Malaysia	396.85	8	427.10	6
7	Chiara Pellacani	Italy	421.00	3	425.90	7
8	Michelle Heimberg	Switzerland	389.40	10	417.90	8
9	Mélodie Leclerc	Canada	406.45	7	400.90	9
10	Valeria Antolino	Spain	393.95	9	400.80	10
11	Sofiya Lyskun	Ukraine	416.75	4	398.75	11
12	Elena Wassen	Germany	370.80	11	391.40	12
13	Helle Tuxen	Norway	367.65	13	did not advance	
14	Anna dos Santos	Brazil	353.45	14	did not advance	
15	Alysha Koloi	Australia	185.65	15	did not advance	

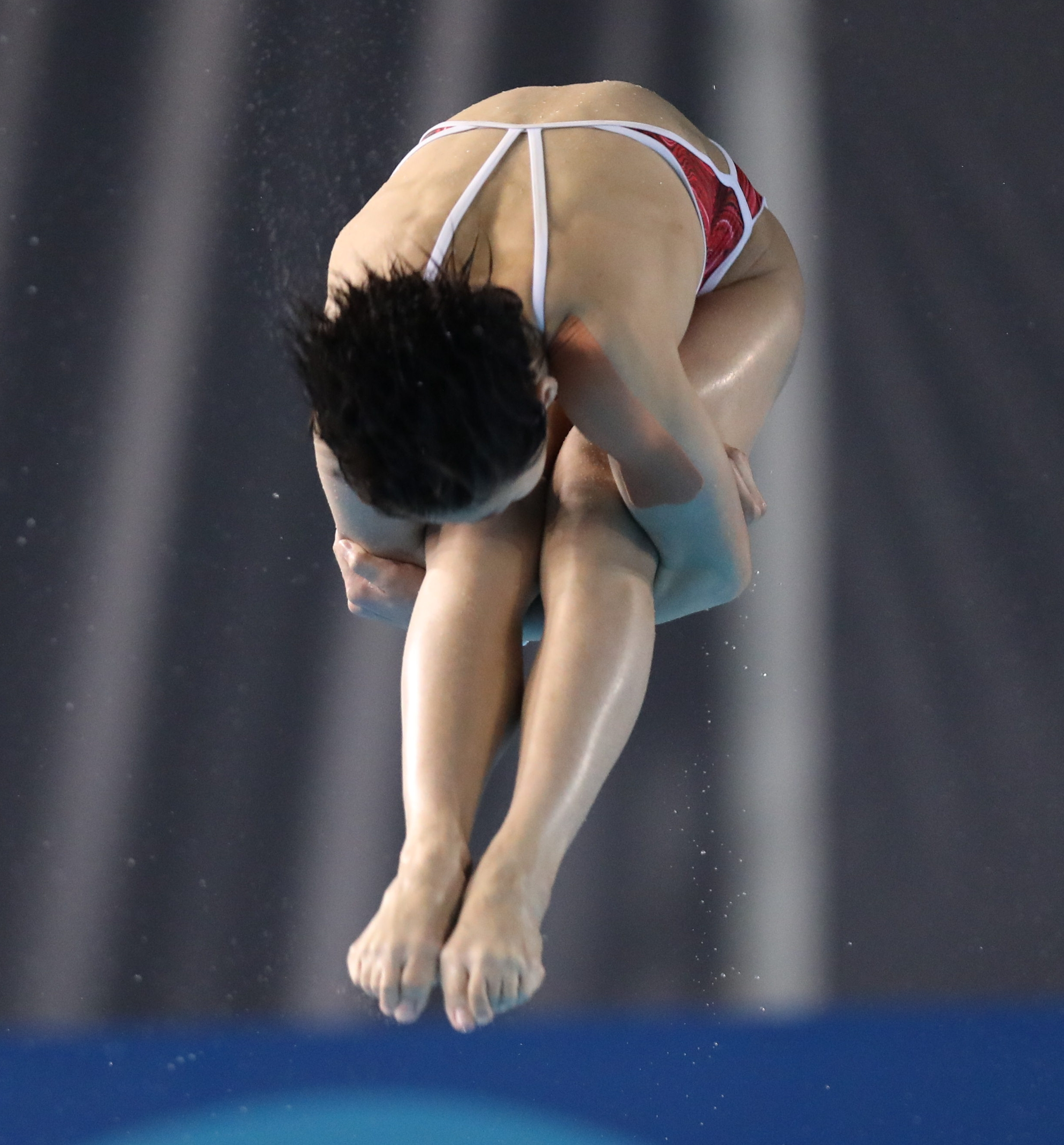
Lin Shan

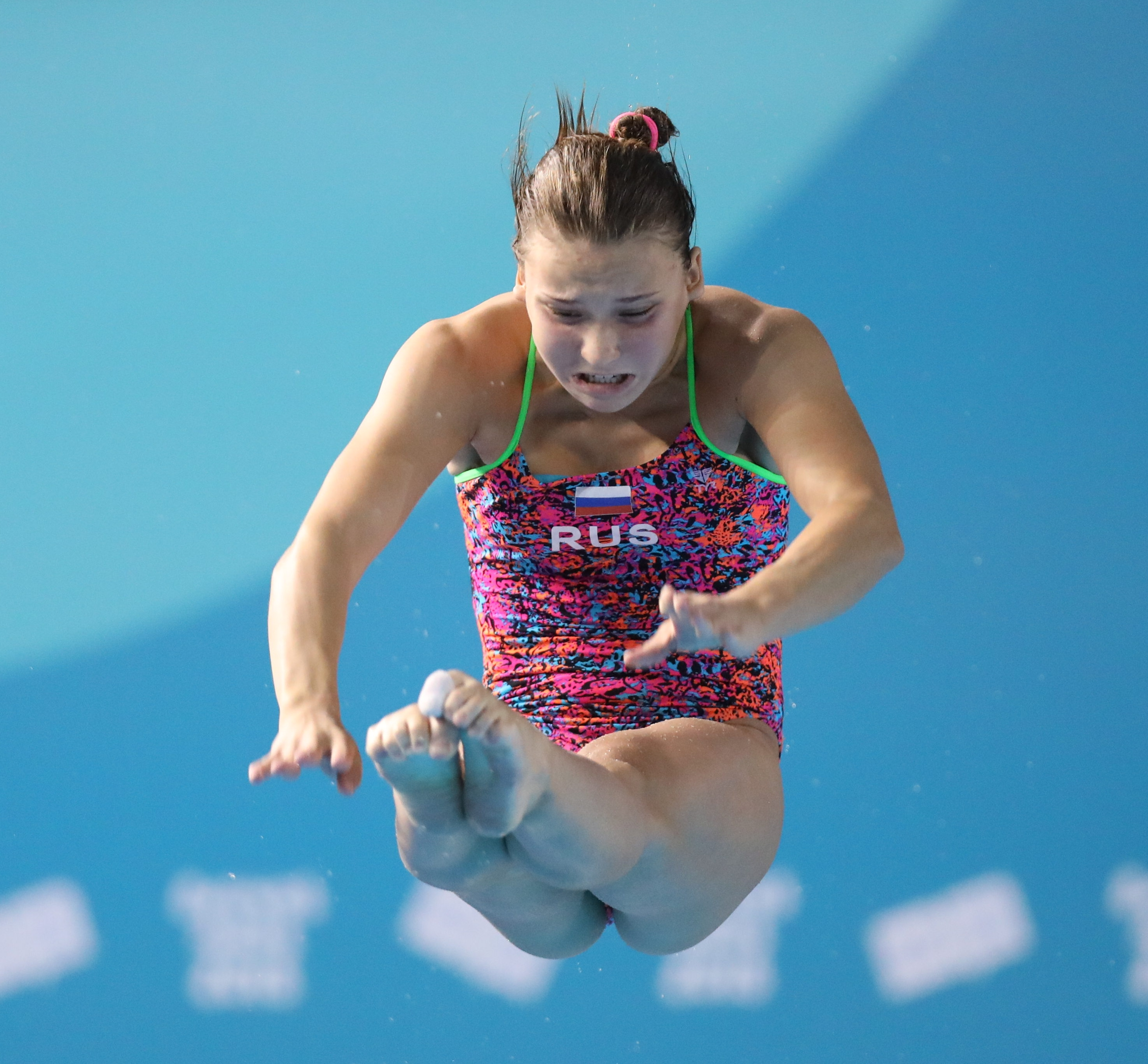
Uliana Kliueva

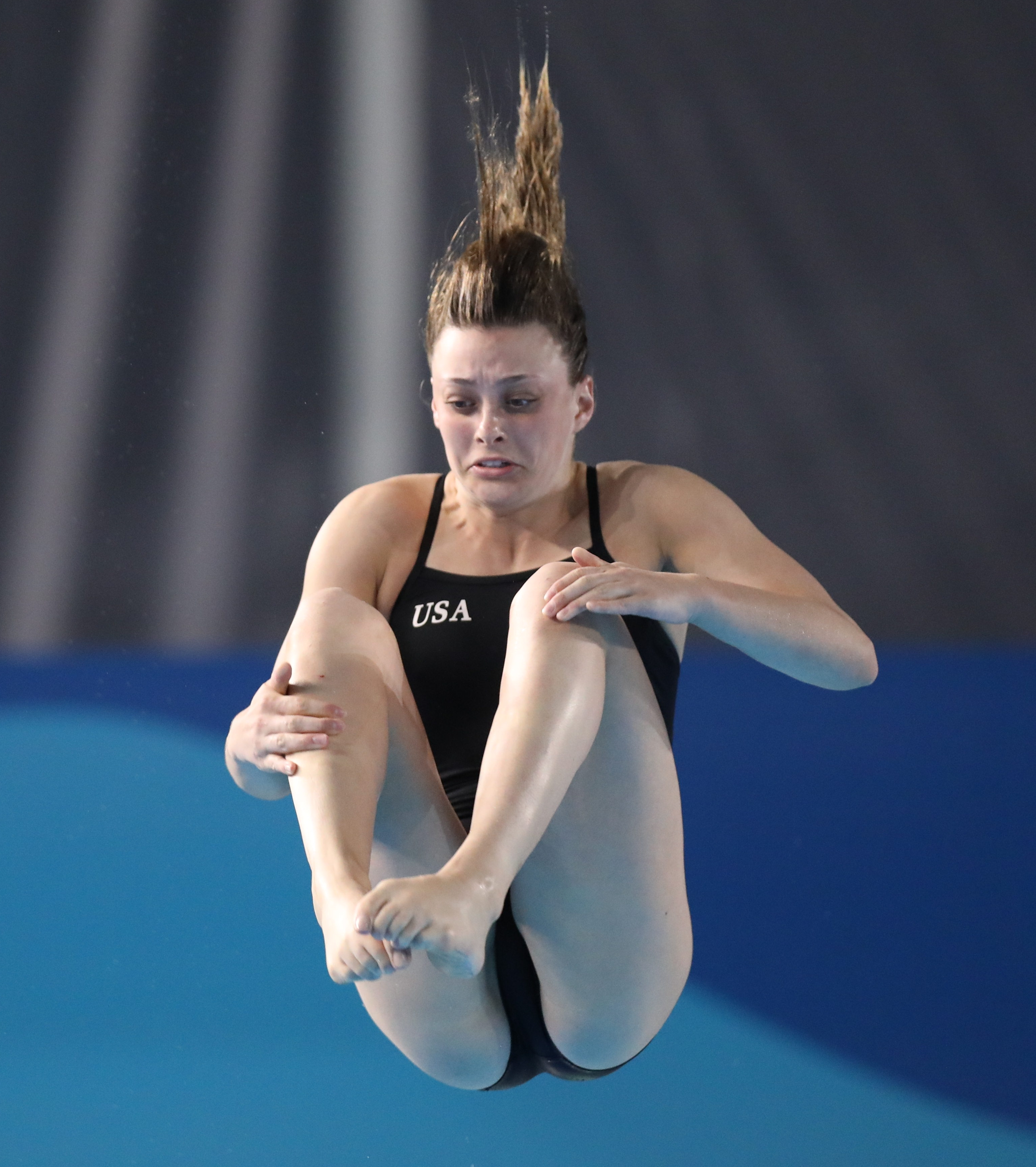
Bridget O'Neil

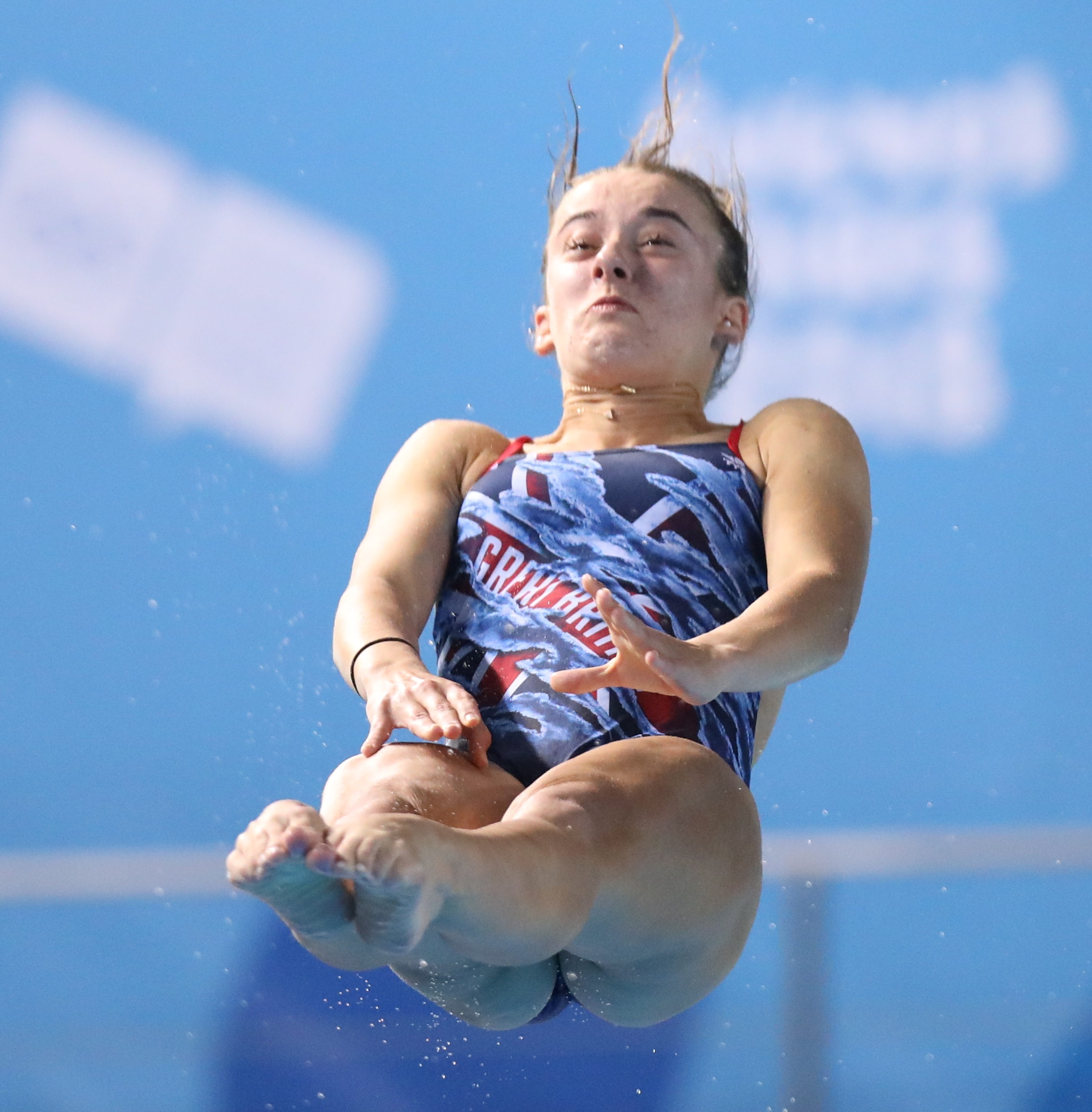
Maria Papworth

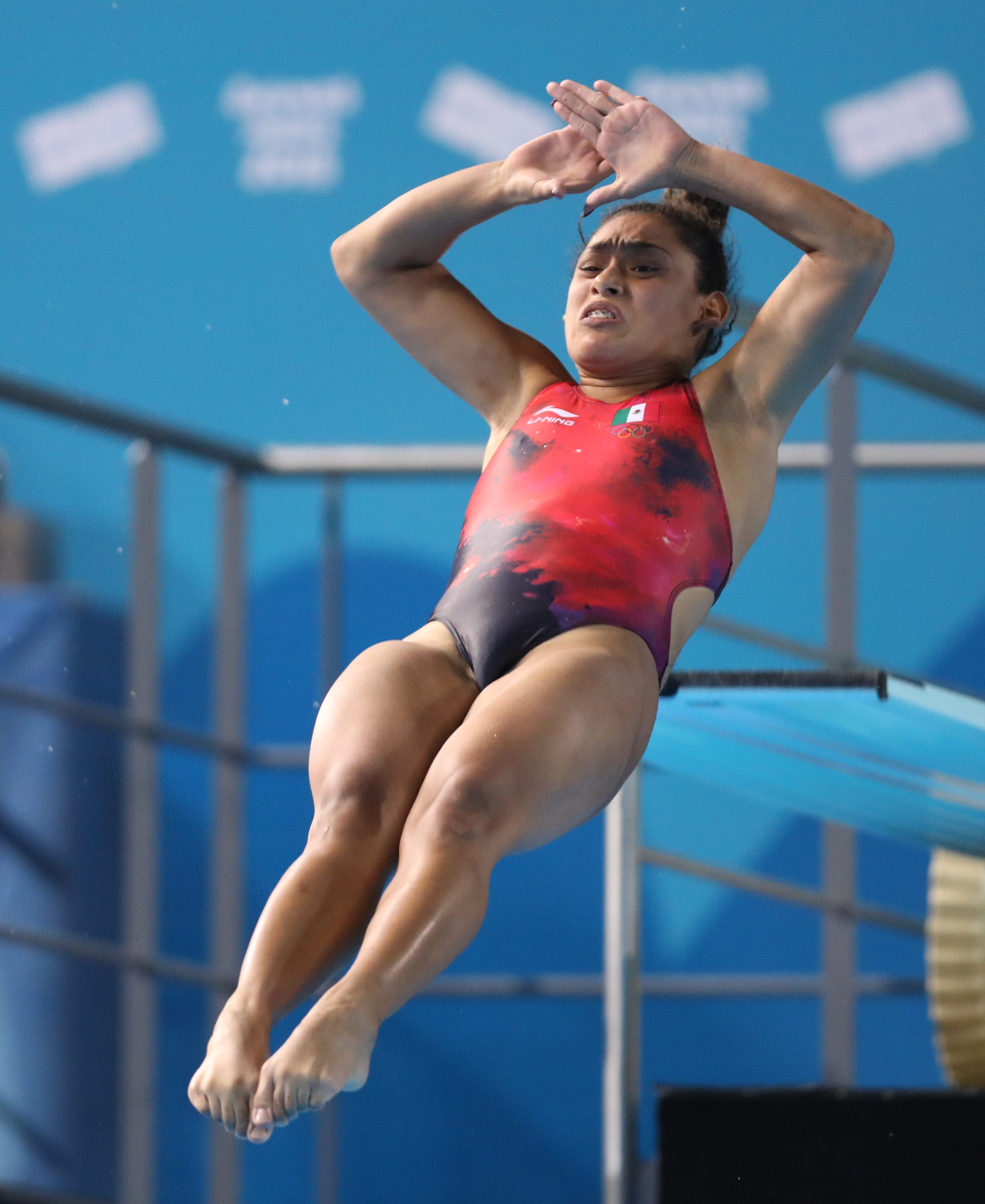
Gabriela Agundes

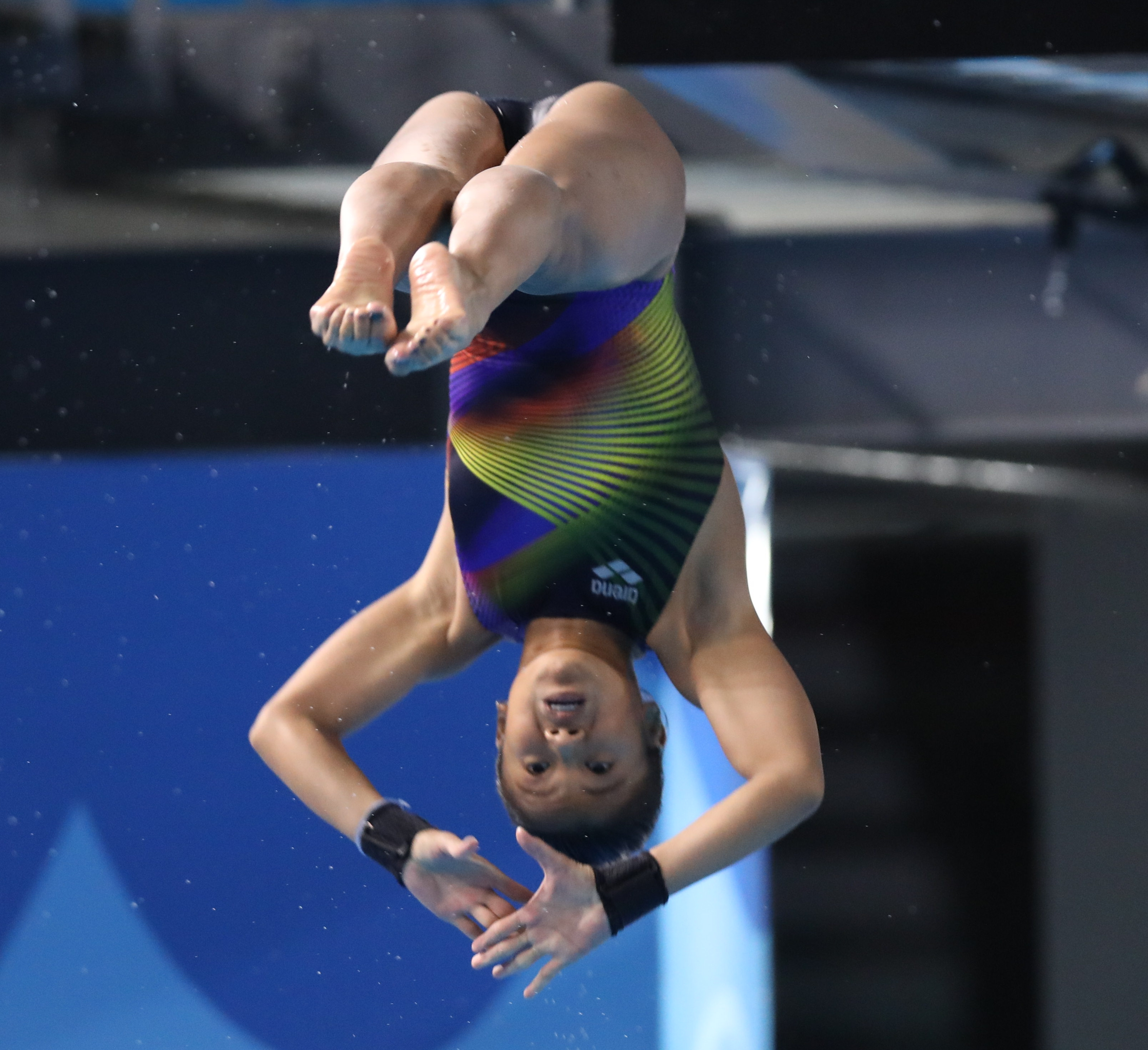
Kimberly Bong

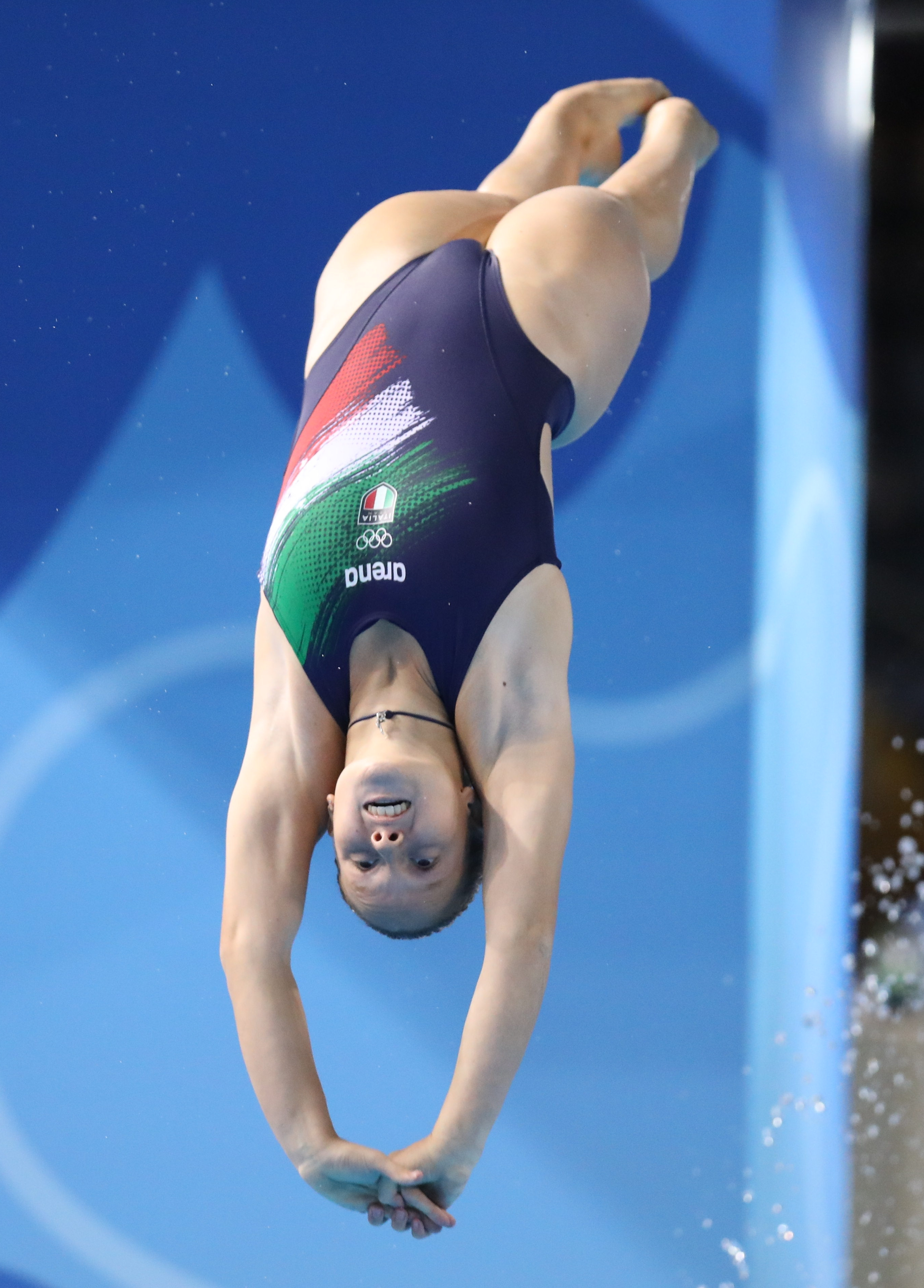
Chiara Pellacani

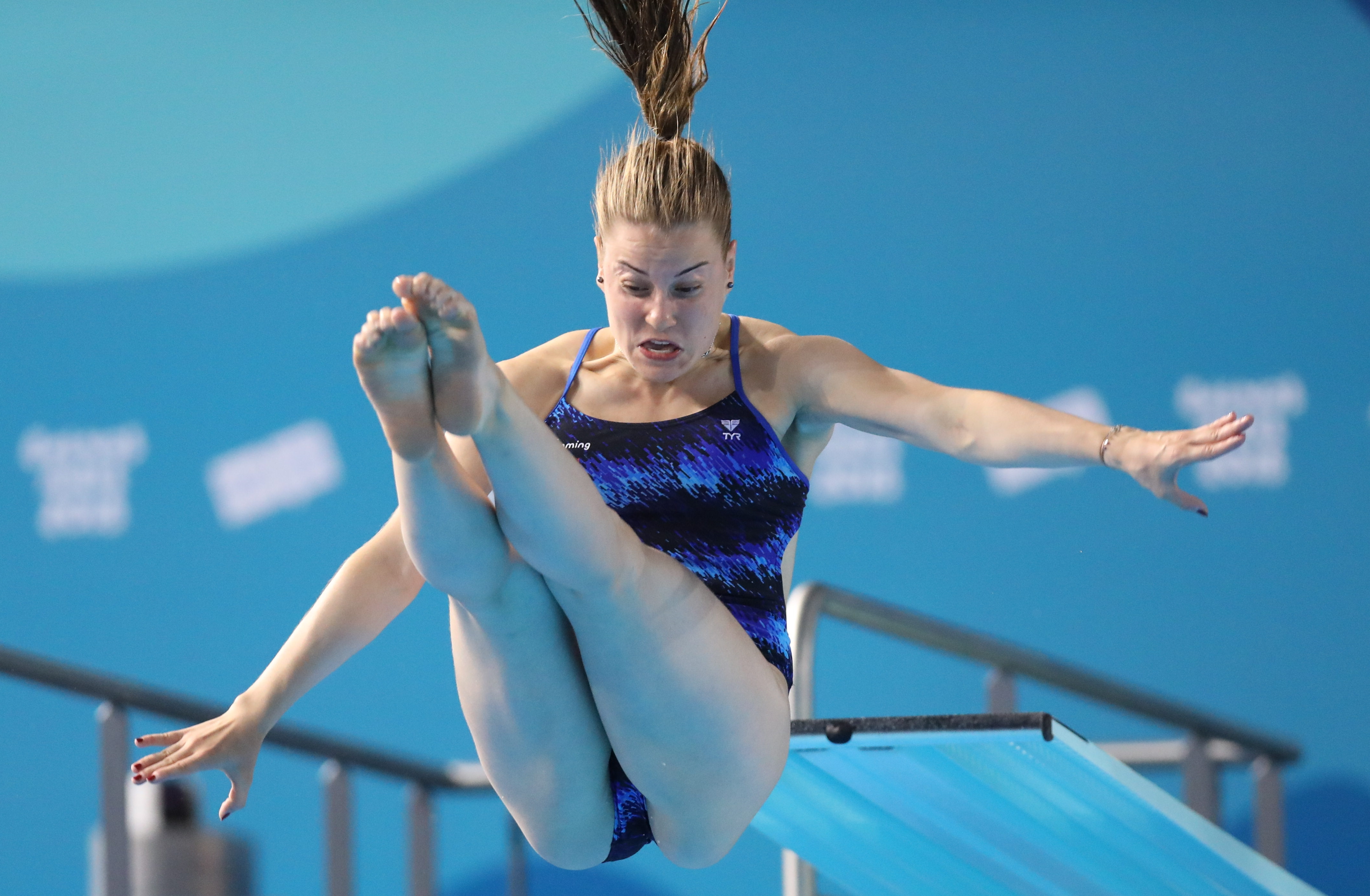
Michelle Heimberg

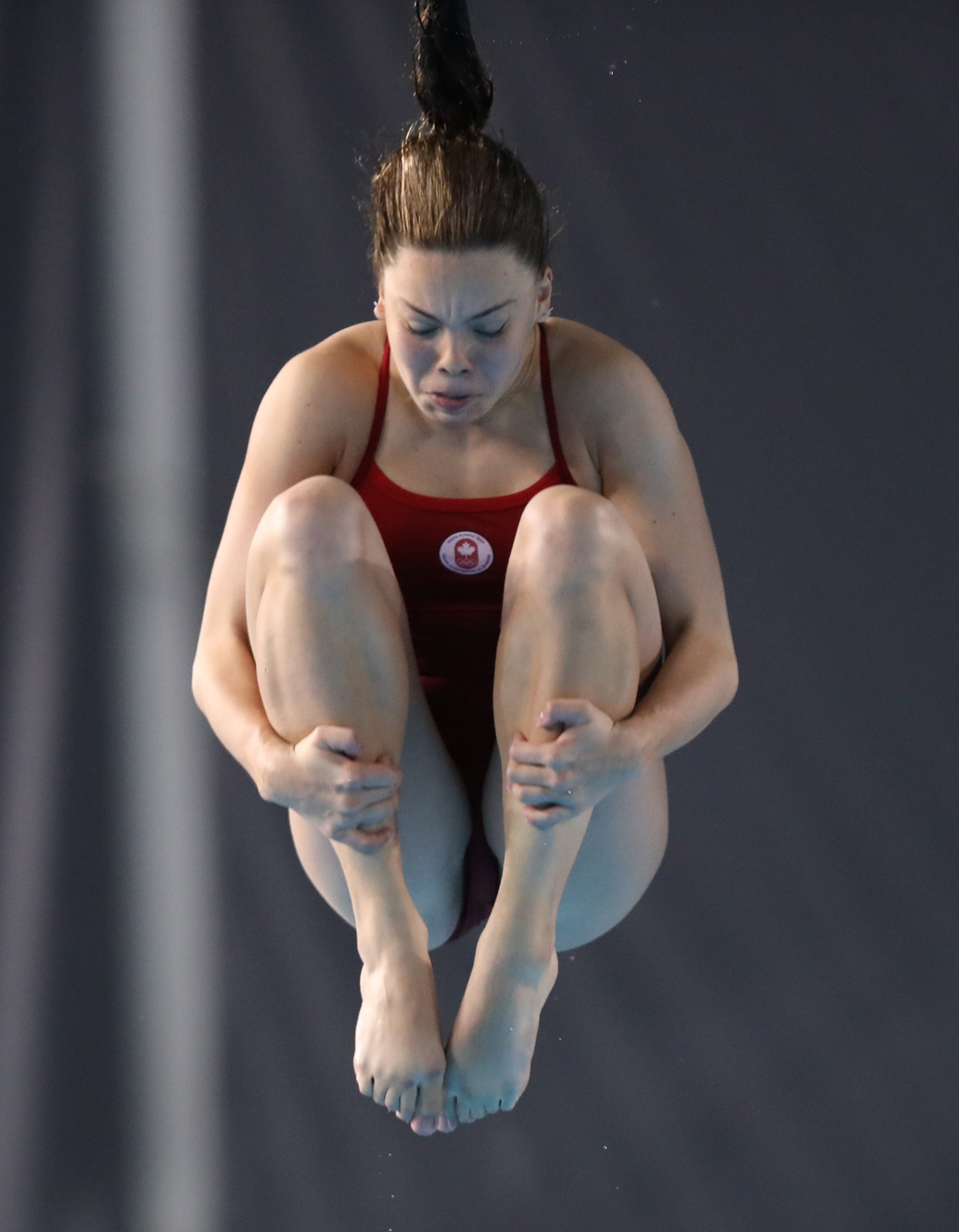
Mélodie Leclerc

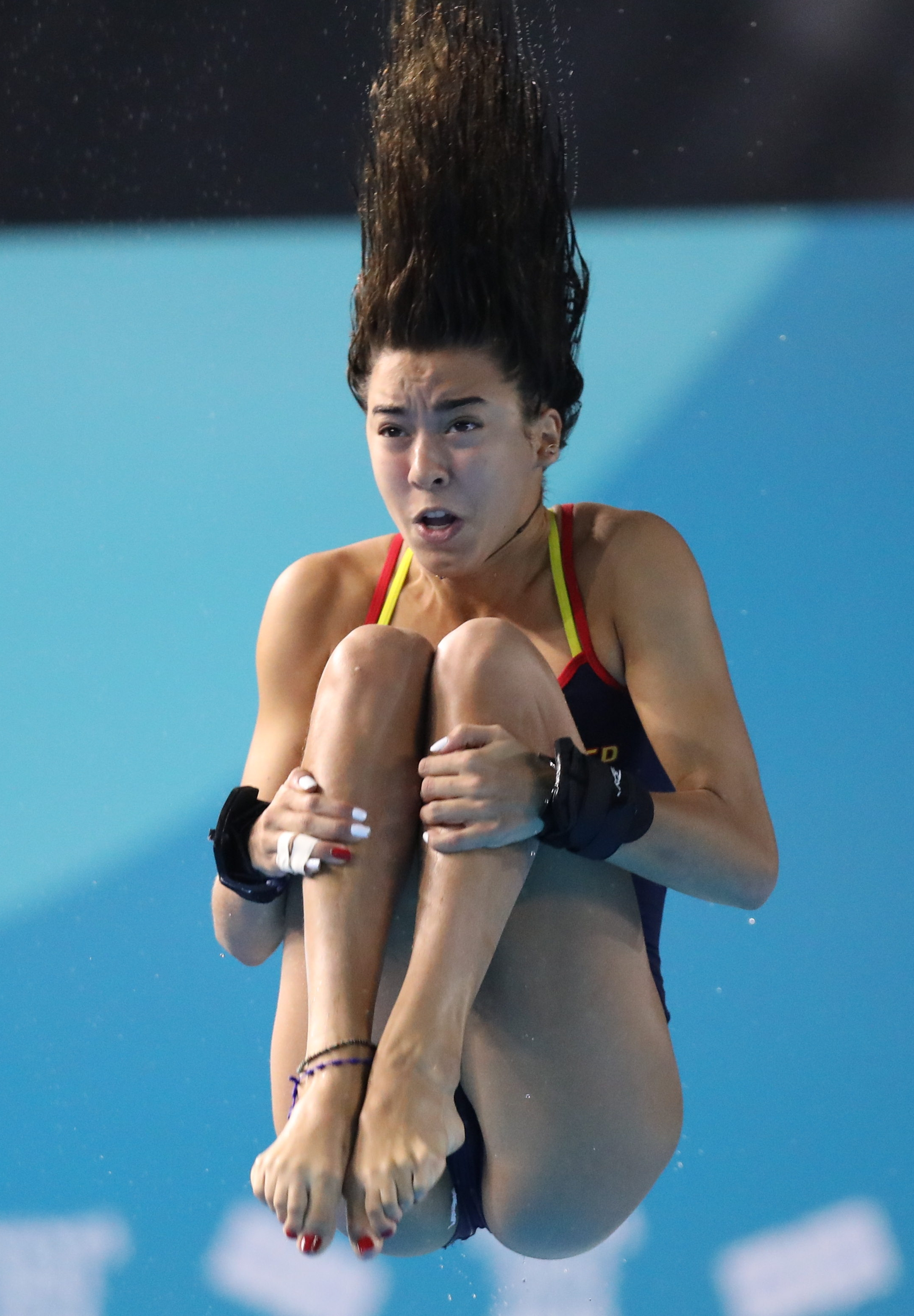
Valeria Antolino

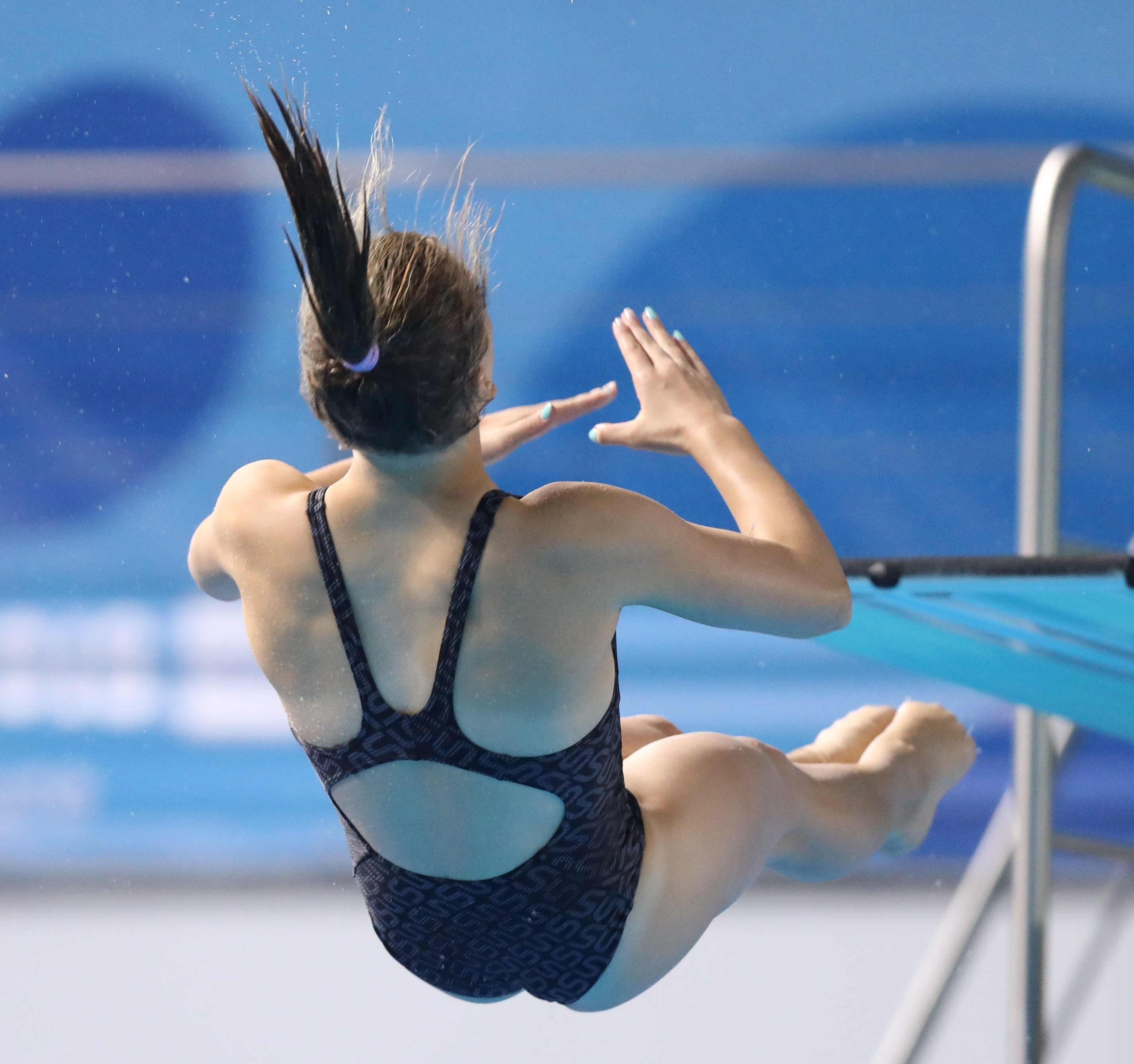
Sofiya Lyskun

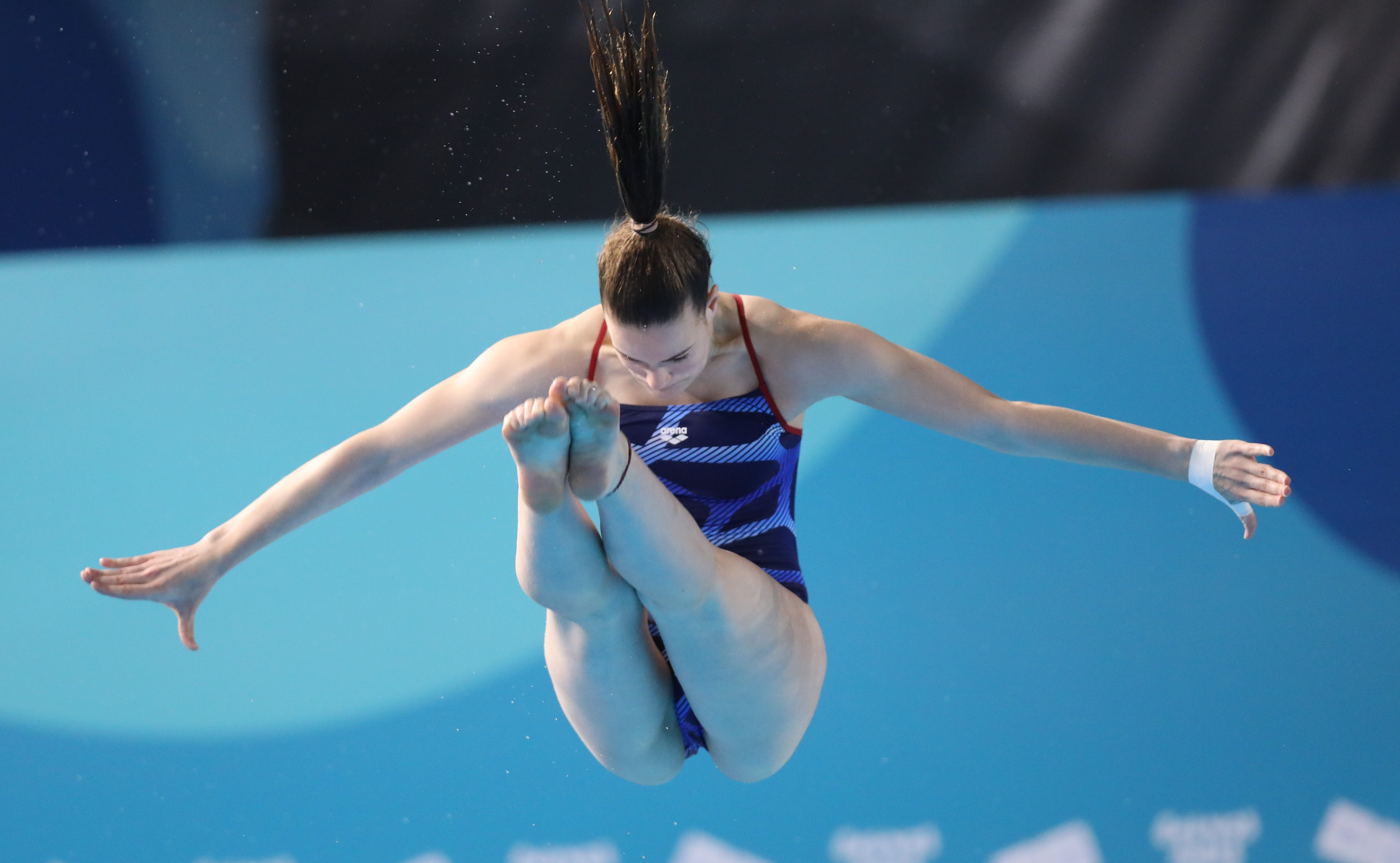
Elena Wassen
