= Stanislav Oliferchyk =

Ukrainian diver (born 1996)

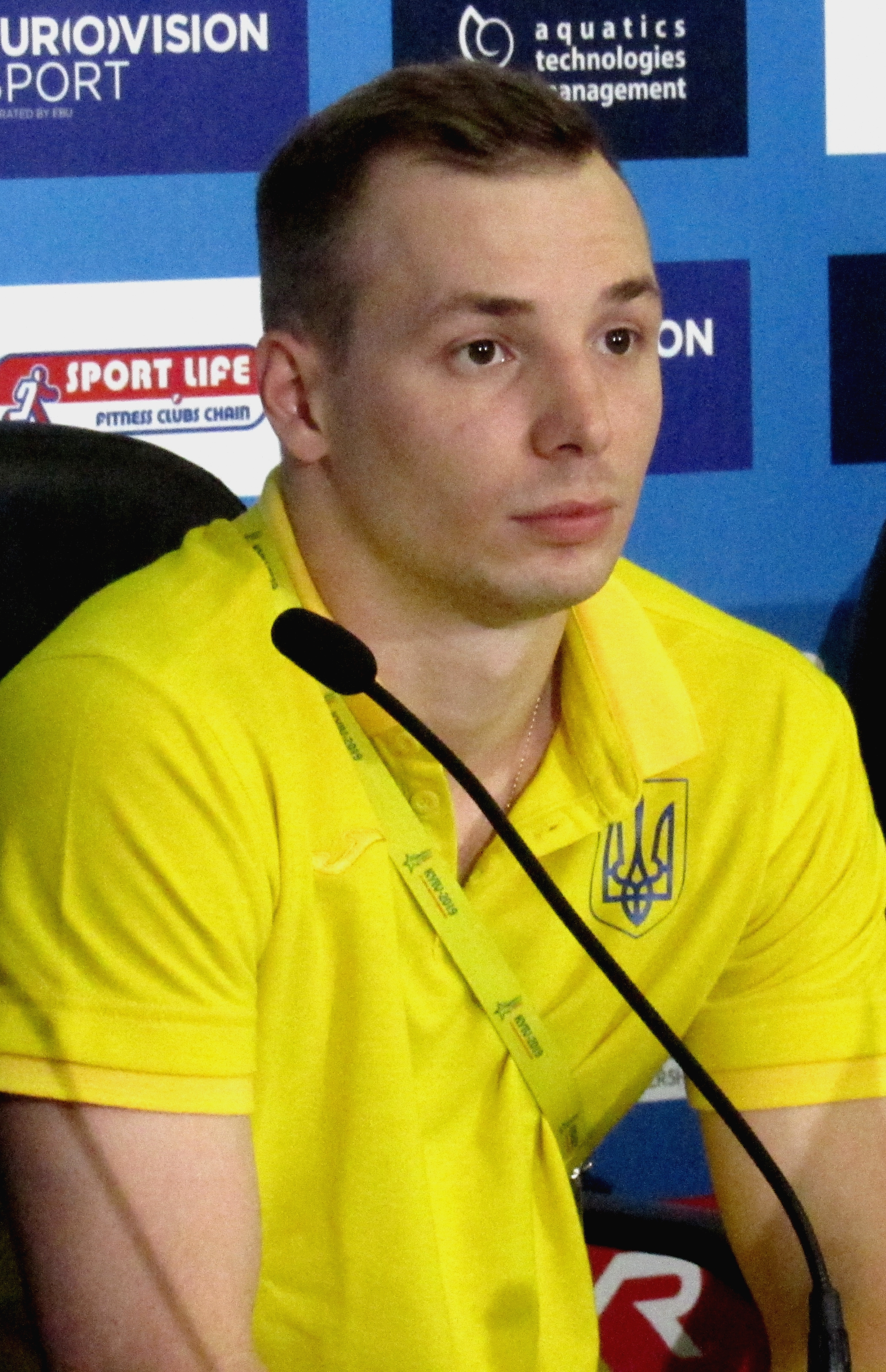

Personal information
- Born: 9 May 1996 (age 30) Mariupol, Ukraine

Sport
- Country: Ukrainian
- Sport: Diving
- Event: 3 m synchro
Medal record
Men's diving
Representing Ukraine
European Championships
Silver medal – second place	2024 Belgrade	Team
Bronze medal – third place	2018 Glasgow	Mixed 3m synchro
European Diving Championships
Gold medal – first place	2019 Kyiv	Mixed 3m synchro
Silver medal – second place	2017 Kyiv	Mixed 3m synchro
Summer Universiade
Silver medal – second place	2017 Taipei	Mixed 3m synchro

Stanislav Oliferchyk (Ukrainian: Станіслав Оліферчик; born 9 May 1996) is a Ukrainian diver. He is a European champion and medalist in synchronized mixed diving with Viktoriya Kesar. In 2017 he won silver medal at the 2017 Summer Universiade.
