= Vitaliia Koroleva =

Russian diver (born 2001)

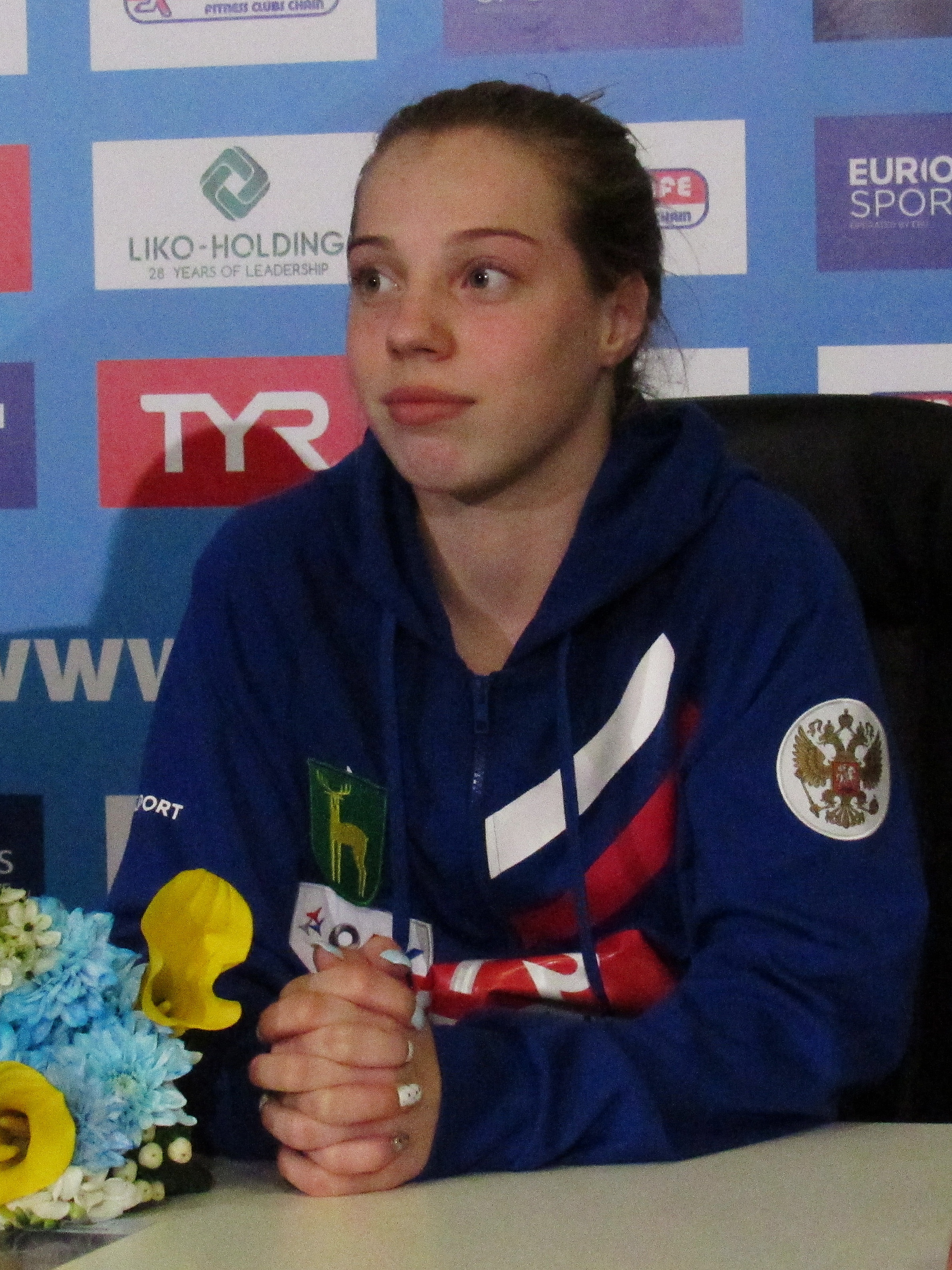
- Vitaliia Koroleva in 2019

Personal information
- Born: 27 May 2001 (age 25)

Sport
- Country: Russia
- Sport: Diving
Medal record
Women's diving
Representing Russia
European Diving Championships
Gold medal – first place	2019 Kyiv	1 m springboard
Gold medal – first place	2019 Kyiv	3 m synchro
European Aquatics Championships
Bronze medal – third place	2020 Budapest	3 m synchro
Bronze medal – third place	2020 Budapest	3 m mixed synchro

Vitaliia Nikolayeva Koroleva (Russian: Виталия Николаевна Королева; born 27 May 2001) is a Russian diver.

In 2017, she competed in the women's 1 metre springboard event at the European Diving Championships held in Kyiv, Ukraine.

In 2019, she won the gold medal in the women's 1 metre springboard event at the European Diving Championships held in Kyiv, Ukraine. Koroleva and Uliana Kliueva won the gold medal in the women's 3 metre synchro springboard event.

In 2021, Koroleva and Ilia Molchanov won the bronze medal in the mixed 3 m springboard synchro event at the 2020 European Aquatics Championships held in Budapest, Hungary. Koroleva and Uliana Kliueva won the bronze medal in the women's 3 m synchro springboard event.
