= Emma Gullstrand =

Swedish diver (born 2000)

Personal information
- Born: 13 September 2000 (age 25) Jönköping, Sweden

Sport
- Country: Sweden
- Sport: Diving
- University team: University of Miami
Medal record
Women's diving
Representing Sweden
European Championships
Silver medal – second place	2022 Rome	1 m springboard
Bronze medal – third place	2020 Budapest	3 m springboard

Emma Gullstrand (born 13 September 2000) is a Swedish diver.

In 2019, she finished in 36th place in the preliminary round in the women's 1 metre springboard event at the 2019 World Aquatics Championships held in Gwangju, South Korea. In the women's 3 metre springboard event she finished in 19th place in the preliminary round. Gullstrand and Vinko Paradzik finished in 14th place in the mixed synchronized 3 metre springboard event.

In that same year, she also finished in 16th place in the preliminary round in the women's 1 metre springboard at the 2019 European Diving Championships held in Kyiv, Ukraine.
