= Maria Coburn =

American diver (born 2001)

Personal information
- Nationality: American
- Born: 22 November 2001 (age 23)

Sport
- Sport: Diving

Maria Coburn (born November 22, 2001) is an American diver. She competed in the women's 1 metre springboard event at the 2019 World Aquatics Championships.
