= Tina Punzel =

German diver

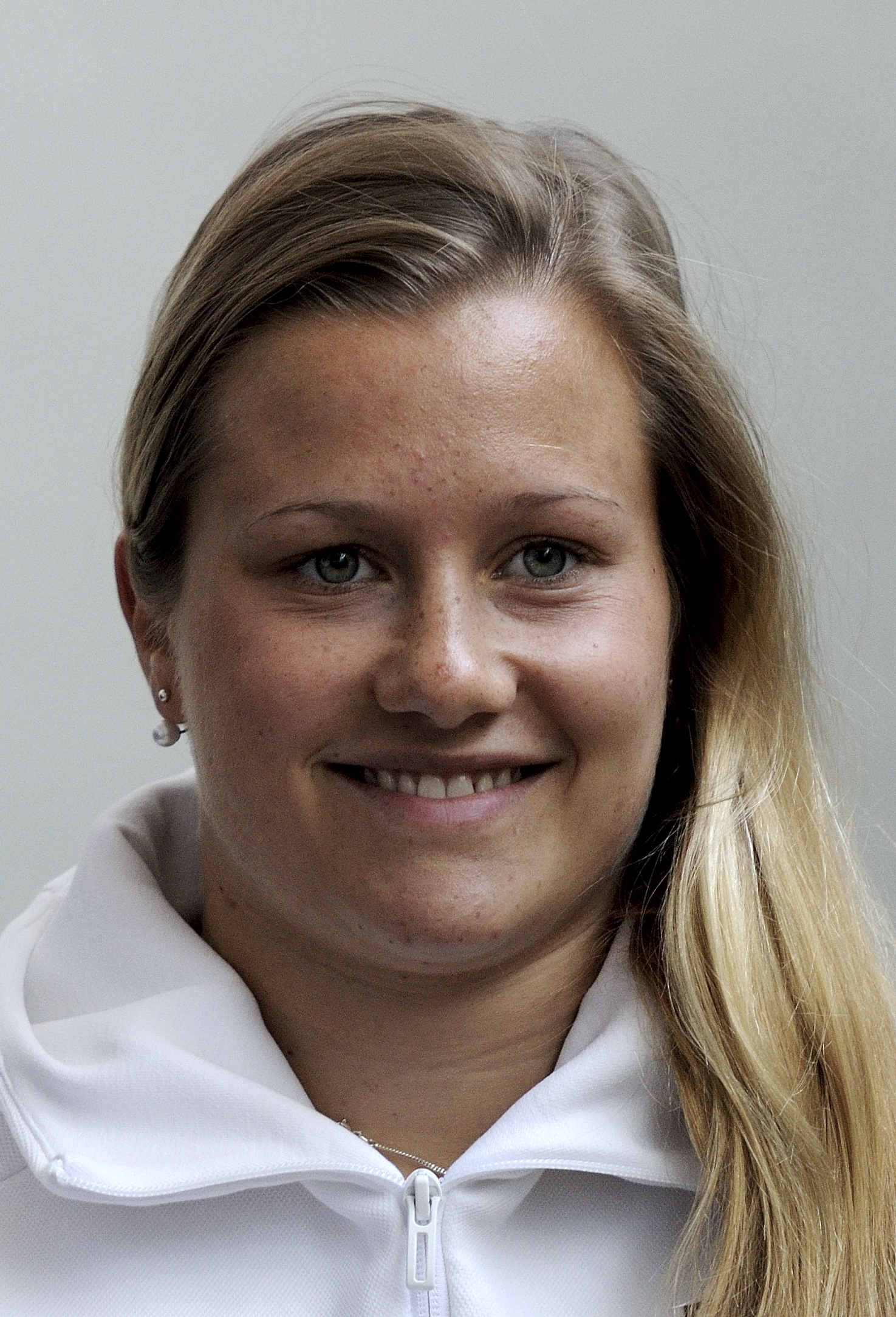
- Punzel in 2016

Personal information
- Nationality: German
- Born: 1 August 1995 (age 30) Dresden, Germany
- Height: 1.67 m (5 ft 6 in)
- Weight: 56 kg (123 lb)

Sport
- Sport: Swimming
- Strokes: Diving
- Club: Dresdner SC 1898
Medal record
Olympic Games
Bronze medal – third place	2020 Tokyo	3 m synchro
World Championships
Bronze medal – third place	2019 Gwangju	Mixed 3m synchro
European Championships
Gold medal – first place	2013 Rostock	3 m springboard
Gold medal – first place	2018 Glasgow	Mixed 3m synchro
Gold medal – first place	2019 Kyiv	Team event
Gold medal – first place	2020 Budapest	3 m springboard
Gold medal – first place	2020 Budapest	3 m synchro
Gold medal – first place	2022 Rome	3 m synchro
Gold medal – first place	2022 Rome	Mixed 3m synchro
Silver medal – second place	2013 Rostock	Team event
Silver medal – second place	2015 Rostock	3 m synchro
Silver medal – second place	2017 Kyiv	3 m synchro
Silver medal – second place	2018 Glasgow	3 m synchro
Silver medal – second place	2019 Kyiv	3 m synchro
Silver medal – second place	2019 Kyiv	Mixed 3m synchro
Silver medal – second place	2020 Budapest	Mixed 3m synchro
Bronze medal – third place	2015 Rostock	3 m springboard
Bronze medal – third place	2017 Kyiv	Mixed 3m synchro
Bronze medal – third place	2018 Glasgow	3 m springboard
Bronze medal – third place	2019 Kyiv	3 m springboard
Bronze medal – third place	2020 Budapest	Team event

Tina Punzel (born 1 August 1995) is a German diver.

== Career ==
Punzel competed at the 2015 World Aquatics Championships.

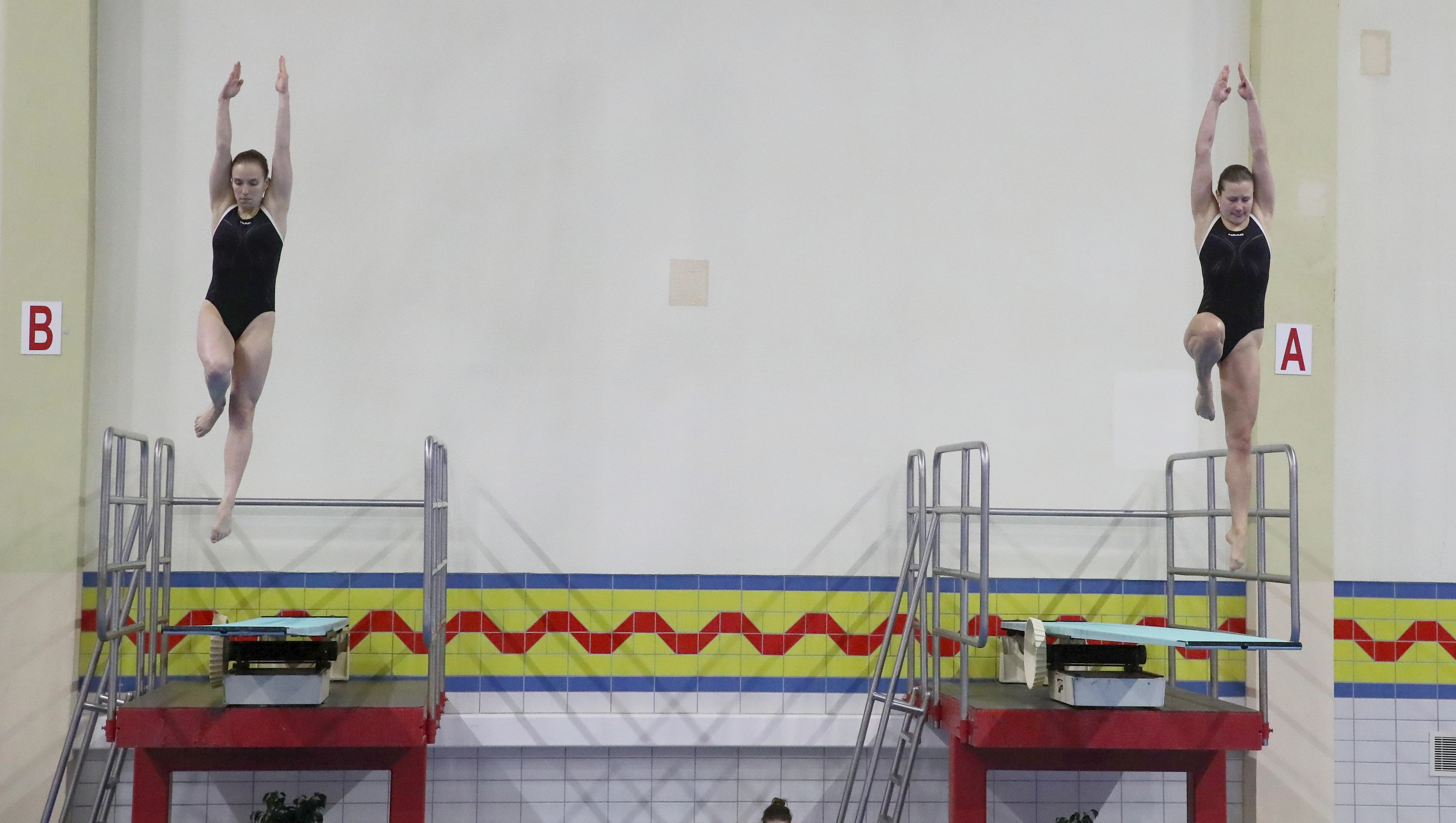
Punzel and Lena Hentschel in 2020

At the 2016 Summer Olympics, she competed in the women's 3 metre springboard event. She finished 17th in the semifinal and did not qualify for the final. She also competed in the women's synchronized 3 metre springboard event with teammate Nora Subschinski. They finished in seventh place.

== See also ==
- Germany at the 2015 World Aquatics Championships
