= Clare Cryan (diver) =

Irish diver

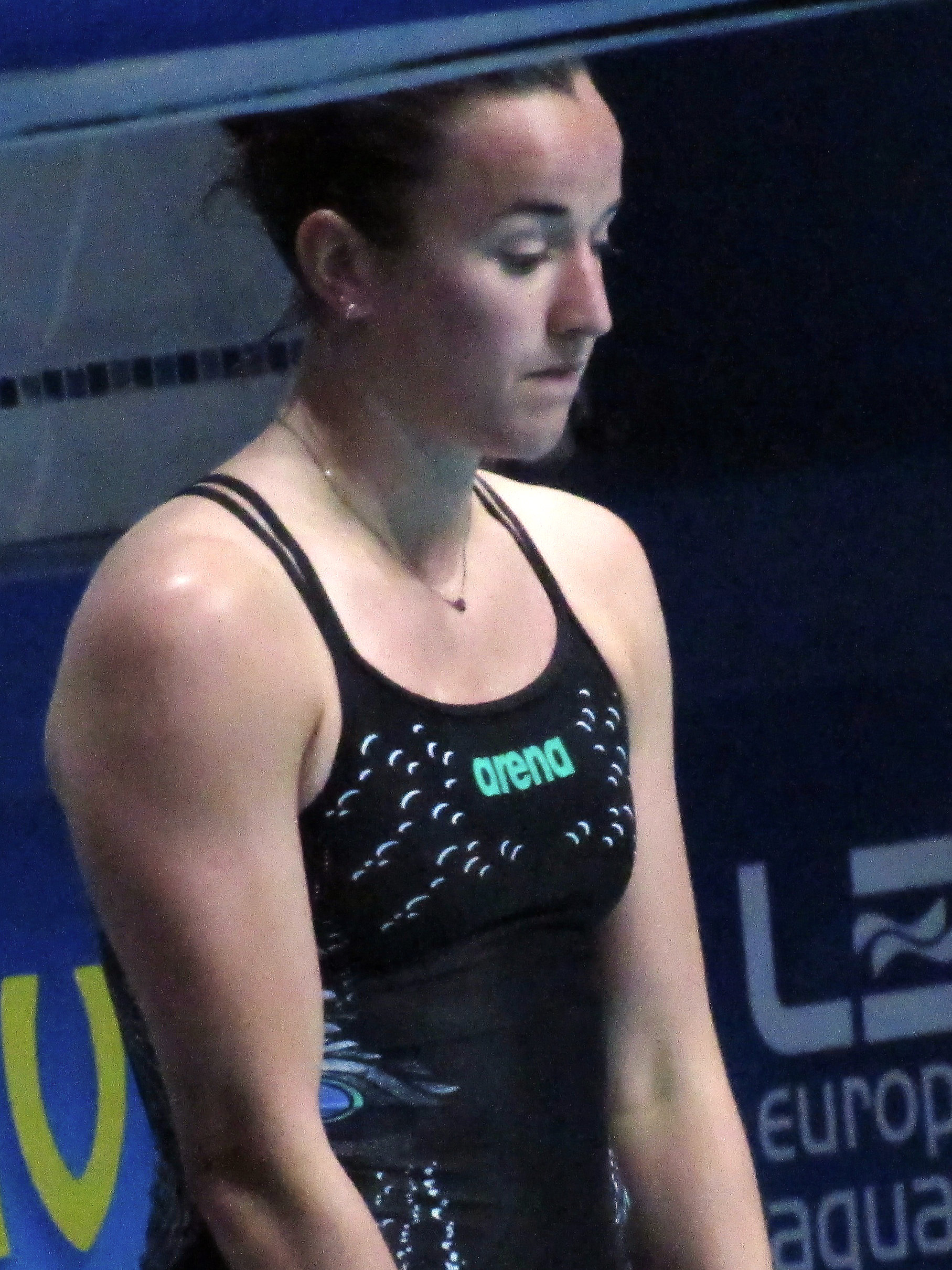

Personal information
- Full name: Clare Joe Cryan
- Nationality: Irish
- Born: 3 December 1993 (age 32)

Sport
- Sport: Diving
Medal record
Representing Ireland
European Championships
Bronze medal – third place	2024 Belgrade	3 m springboard

Clare Cryan (born 3 December 1993) is a retired Irish diver. She competed in the women's 1 metre springboard event at the 2019 World Aquatics Championships. In the women's 3 metre springboard event she finished in 23rd place in the preliminary round.

== Career ==
In 2024 Cyran won Bronze at the 2024 European Aquatics Championships in the 3m Springboard

Results At World Championships
Competition	Event	Finish
2019 World Aquatics Championships	Women's 1 metre Springboard	11th
2019 World Aquatics Championships	women's 3 metre springboard	23rd
2019 World Aquatics Championships	Synchronized 3 m Springboard Partner Oliver Dingley	12th
2022 World Aquatics Championships	1 m springboard	33rd
2022 World Aquatics Championships	3 m springboard	23rd
2023 World Aquatics Championships	1 m springboard	17th
2023 World Aquatics Championships	3 m springboard	17th
2023 World Aquatics Championships	3 m synchronized springboard Partner Jake Passmore	15th
2024 World Aquatics Championships	3 m springboard	44th
2024 World Aquatics Championships	Synchronized 3 m springboard Partner Jake Passmore	12th
