= Marcela Marić =

Croatian diver

Personal information
- Nationality: Croatian
- Born: 18 October 1996 (age 29) Zadar, Croatia
- Height: 1.55 m (5 ft 1 in)

Sport
- Sport: Diving
- Event: 3 metre springboard
- College team: Miami Hurricanes

Marcela Marić (born 18 October 1996) is a Croatian diver. She competed in the women's 3 metre springboard at the 2016 Summer Olympics, where she finished 25th out of 29 competitors.

In 2019, she finished in 35th place in the preliminary round in the women's 1 metre springboard event at the 2019 World Aquatics Championships held in Gwangju, South Korea. In the women's 3 metre springboard event she finished in 44th place in the preliminary round.

== Personal life ==
Marić attends the University of Miami.
