= Inge Jansen =

Dutch diver (born 1994)

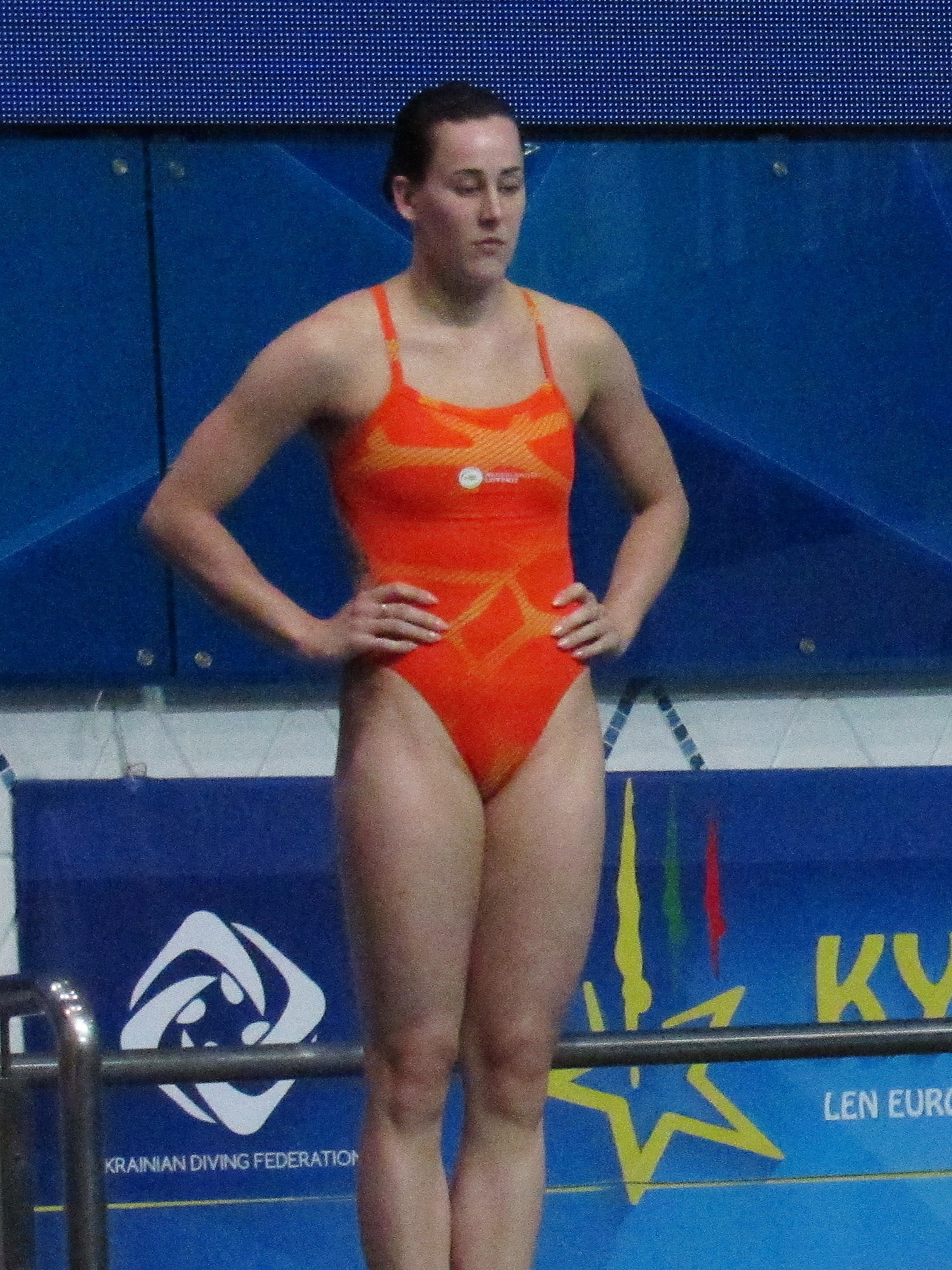
- Inge Jansen in 2019

Personal information
- Nationality: Dutch
- Born: 2 June 1994 (age 32) Roermond, Netherlands

Sport
- Sport: Diving
Medal record
European Championships
Gold medal – first place	2019 Kyiv	3 m springboard
Bronze medal – third place	2017 Kyiv	3 m synchro

Inge Jansen (born 2 June 1994) is a Dutch diver. She competed in the women's 3 metre springboard event at the 2019 World Aquatics Championships.
