= Katherine Torrance =

British diver (born 1998)

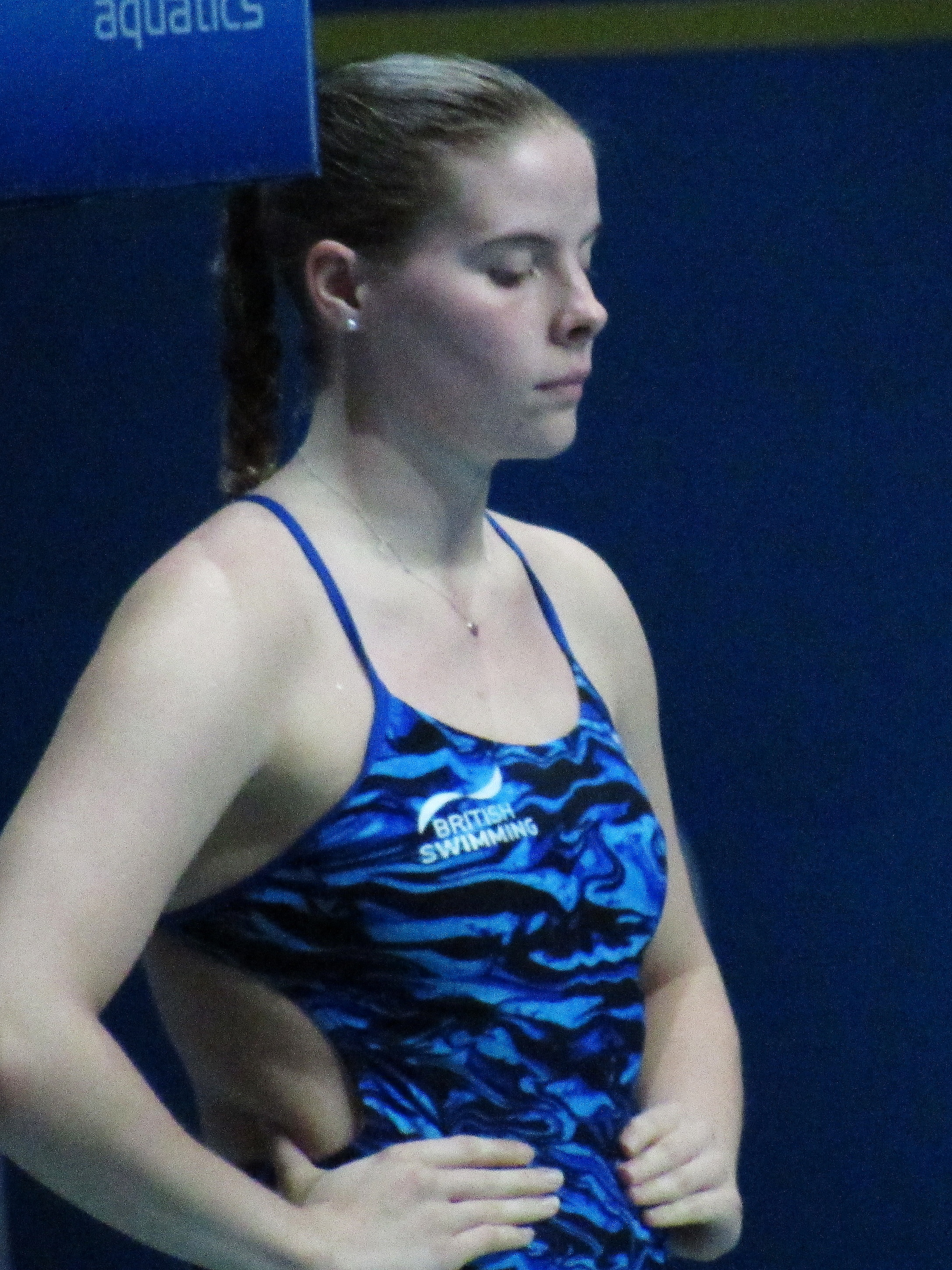
- Torrance at the 2019 European Diving Championships in Kyiv

Personal information
- Nickname: Kat
- Nationality: British
- Born: 10 October 1998 (age 27) Croydon, England
- Height: 1.71 m (5 ft 7 in)

Sport
- Country: England
- Sport: Diving
Medal record
Commonwealth Games
Silver medal – second place	2018 Gold Coast	synchronized 3 metre springboard

Katherine Torrance (born 10 October 1998) is a British diver.

Torrance was born in Croydon. Her senior European debut came in 2016. Later that year, she won two gold medals and one bronze medal at the World Junior Championship competition. She competed in the women's 1 metre springboard event at the 2019 World Aquatics Championships.

She competed in the 2018 Commonwealth Games where she won a silver medal in the synchronized 3 metre springboard event alongside Alicia Blagg.

She finished sixth in the women's synchronized 3 metre springboard event alongside Grace Reid in the 2020 Summer Olympics.
