= Jessica Favre =

Swiss diver

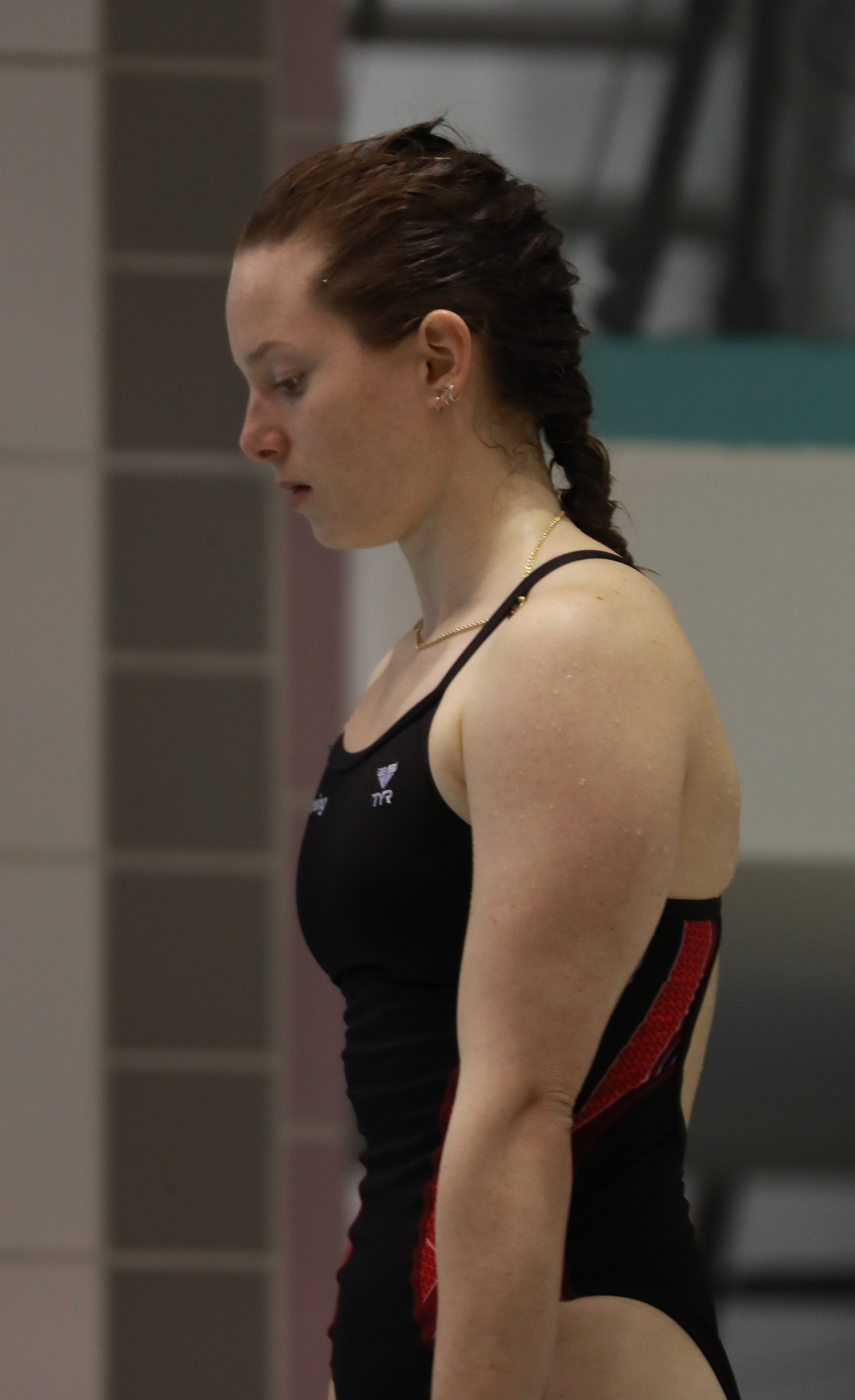
- Jessica Favre in 2018

Personal information
- Nationality: Swiss
- Born: 2 May 1995 (age 29)

Sport
- Sport: Diving

Jessica Favre (born 2 May 1995) is a Swiss diver. She competed in the women's 3 metre springboard event at the 2019 World Aquatics Championships. She finished in 20th place in the preliminary round.
