= Alena Khamulkina =

Belarusian diver

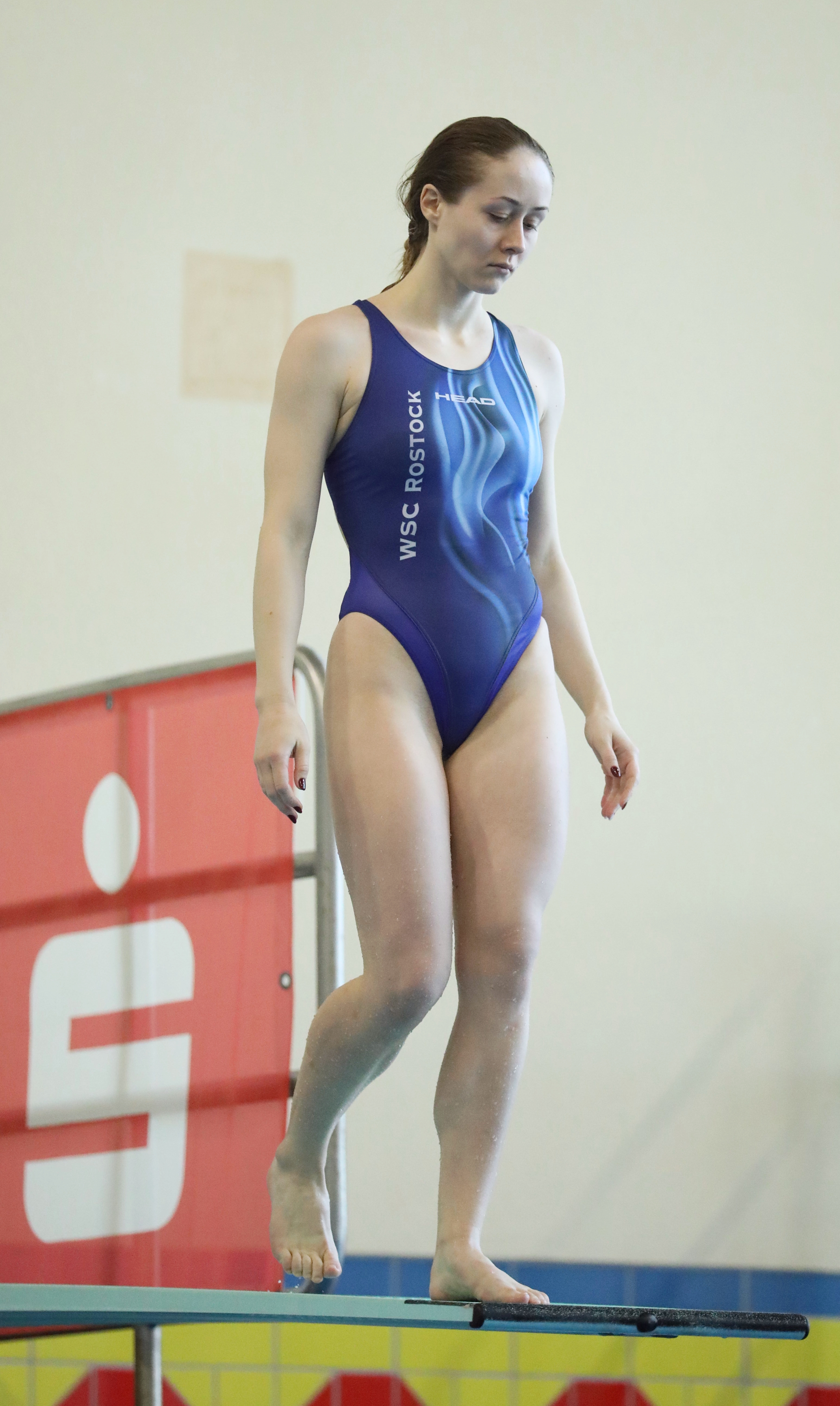
- Khamulkina in 2023

Personal information
- Born: 24 July 1997 (age 27)

Sport
- Country: Belarus
- Sport: Diving

Alena Khamulkina (born 24 July 1997) is a Belarusian diver. In 2019, she finished in 29th place in the preliminary round in the women's 1 metre springboard event at the World Aquatics Championships held in Gwangju, South Korea. In the women's 3 metre springboard event she finished in 27th place in the preliminary round.

She also represented Belarus at the 2017 World Aquatics Championships in Budapest, Hungary and at the 2015 World Aquatics Championships in Kazan, Russia.
