= Viktoriya Kesar =

Ukrainian diver (born 1993)

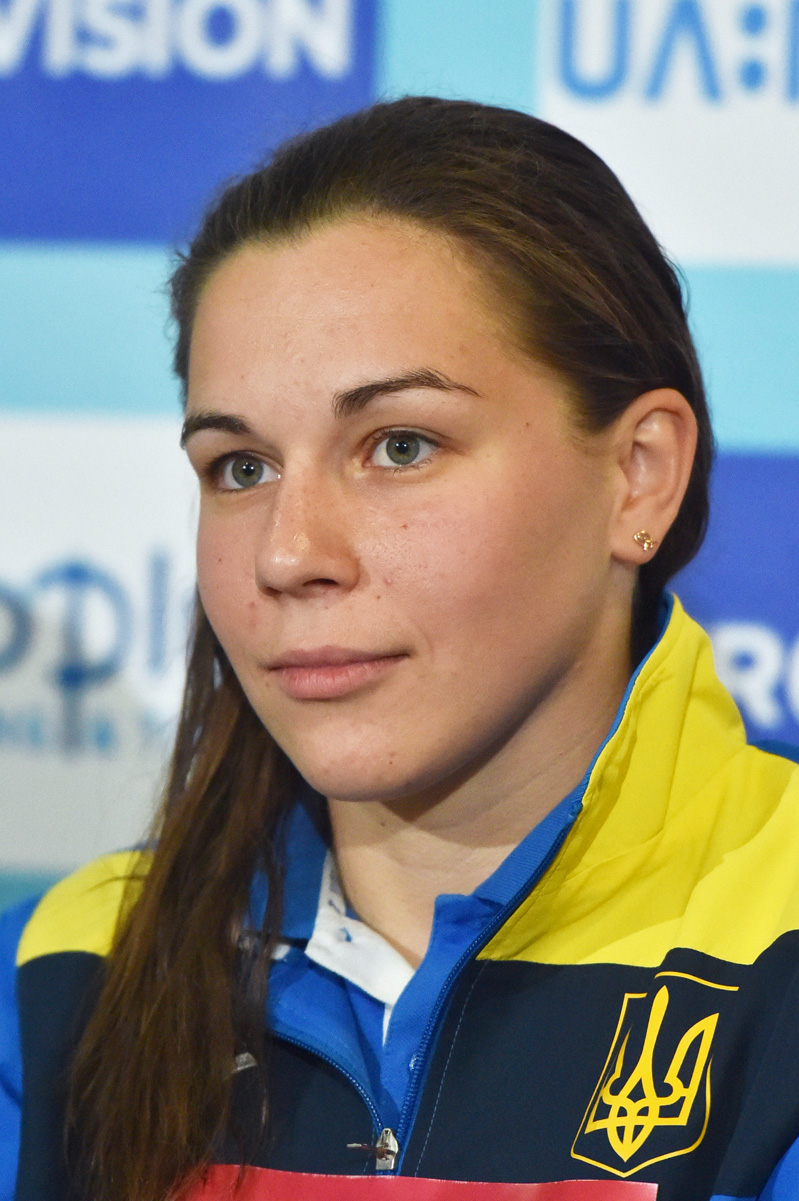
- Kesar at the 2017 European Championships

Personal information
- Born: 11 August 1993 (age 32) Zaporizhia, Ukraine

Sport
- Country: Ukrainian
- Sport: Diving
- Event: 3 m synchro
Medal record
Women's diving
Representing Ukraine
European Championships
Silver medal – second place	2022 Rome	Team event
Bronze medal – third place	2018 Glasgow	Mixed 3m synchro
European Diving Championships
Gold medal – first place	2019 Kyiv	Mixed 3m synchro
Silver medal – second place	2017 Kyiv	Team event
Silver medal – second place	2017 Kyiv	Mixed 3m synchro
Bronze medal – third place	2019 Kyiv	3m synchro
Summer Universiade
Silver medal – second place	2017 Taipei	Mixed 3m synchro
World Junior Championships
Bronze medal – third place	2010 Tucson	3m synchro
European Junior Championships
Silver medal – second place	2010 Helsinki	3m synchro
Silver medal – second place	2010 Helsinki	1m springboard

Viktoriya Yuriyivna Kesar (Ukrainian: Вікторія Юріївна Кесарь; born 11 August 1993) is a Ukrainian diver.

== Career ==
She is a European champion and medalist. She won her gold medal in 3m synchronized diving with Stanislav Oliferchyk at the 2019 European Diving Championships, they also won silver medals in 2017. In 2019 she also won a bronze medal of the European Championships in 3m synchro diving with her partner Hanna Pysmenska.

In 2017 she won silver medal at the 2017 Summer Universiade.

She competed at the 2024 Summer Olympics where she came 7th in the 3 metre springboard event alongside Hanna Pysmenska.
