= Elena Bertocchi =

Italian diver (born 1994)

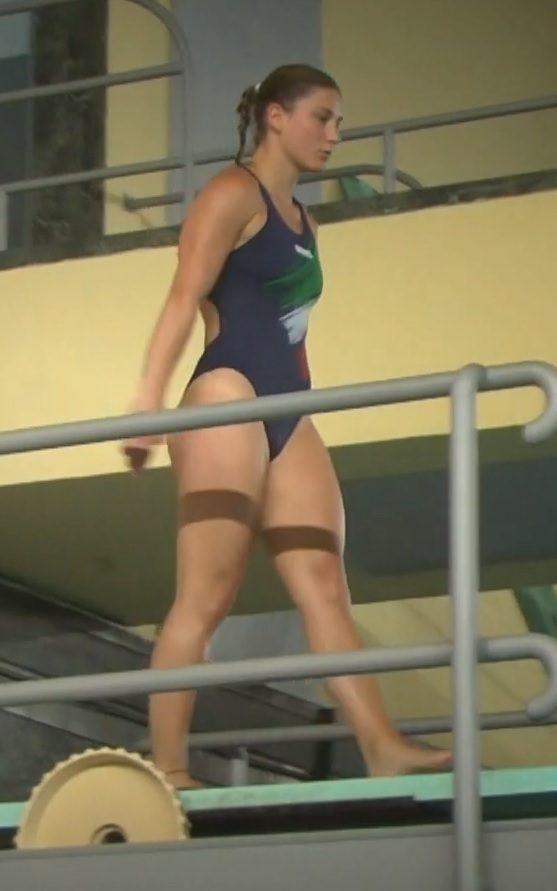

Personal information
- Born: 19 September 1994 (age 31) Milan, Italy
- Height: 1.62 m (5 ft 4 in)

Sport
- Country: Italy
- Sport: Diving
Medal record
Women's diving
Representing Italy
Event	1st	2nd	3rd
Olympic Games	0	0	0
World Championships	0	0	2
European Championships	3	3	1
Total	3	3	3
World Championships
Bronze medal – third place	2017 Budapest	1 m springboard
Bronze medal – third place	2023 Fukuoka	3 m synchro
European Games
Bronze medal – third place	2023 Kraków-Małopolska	3 m synchro
European Championships
Gold medal – first place	2018 Glasgow	3 m synchro
Gold medal – first place	2020 Budapest	1 m springboard
Gold medal – first place	2022 Rome	1 m springboard
Silver medal – second place	2016 London	1 m springboard
Silver medal – second place	2020 Budapest	3 m synchro
Silver medal – second place	2022 Rome	3 m synchro
Bronze medal – third place	2018 Glasgow	1 m springboard
European Diving Championships
Gold medal – first place	2017 Kyiv	1 m springboard
Gold medal – first place	2017 Kyiv	3 m mixed synchro
Bronze medal – third place	2023 Rzeszów	3 m synchro

Elena Bertocchi (born 19 September 1994) is an Italian diver. She competed at the 2015 World Aquatics Championships. She qualified for the 2020 Summer Olympics.

She competed at the 2024 Summer Olympics where she came 4th in the 3 metre springboard event alongside Chiara Pellacani.

== See also ==
- Italy at the 2015 World Aquatics Championships
