= 2023 FINA Diving World Cup =

International diving competition

- Host city: Berlin, Germany
- Date: 4–6 August 2023
- Nations: 18
- Website: FINA event page

The 2023 FINA Diving World Cup was scheduled to take place in Berlin, Germany, from 4 to 6 August 2023. It was to be the 24th edition of the biennial diving competition, and the second time this specific FINA event was to be held in Berlin and Germany.

The event served as a Super Final to two previous events, Stops 1 and 2 of the Diving World Cup, held in Xi'an, China (14 – 16 April 2023) and Montreal, Canada (5 – 7 May 2023).

== Schedule ==
All times are local Central European Time (UTC+1) and based on approximate entry numbers. They will be subject to revision.

Day	Date	Event	Time
1	4 Aug	10m Synchro Finals (Women's)	09:02
1	4 Aug	3m Synchro Finals (Men's)	10:32
1	4 Aug	3m Synchro Finals (Women's)	14:32
1	4 Aug	10m Synchro Finals (Men's)	16:02
2	5 Aug	3m Prelims (Men's)	08:32
2	5 Aug	10m Prelims (Women's)	11:32
2	5 Aug	3m Finals (Men's)	14:32
2	5 Aug	10m Finals (Women's)	16:47
3	6 Aug	3m Prelims (Women's)	08:32
3	6 Aug	10m Prelims (Men's)	11:32
3	6 Aug	3m Finals (Women's)	14:32
3	6 Aug	10m Finals (Men's)	16:32
3	6 Aug	Mixed 3m & 10m Team Finals	18:32

== Medal summary ==
=== Men's events ===
Event	Gold		Silver		Bronze	
3m springboard	China; Wang Zongyuan	540.60	Germany; Moritz Wesemann	464.15	United States; Andrew Capobianco	425.50
10m platform	China; Yang Hao	537.25	Ukraine; Oleksii Sereda	480.45	United Kingdom; Noah Williams	468.05
Synchronized; 3m Springboard	China; Wang Zongyuan and Long Daoyi	451.44	United Kingdom; Jordan Christopher Houlden and Anthony Harding	395.40	Italy; Lorenzo Marsaglia and Giovanni Tocci	381.87
Synchronized; 10m Platform	China; Yang Hao and Lian Junije	471.00	Australia; Cassiel Rousseau and Domonic Bedggood	411.84	Mexico; Jose Balleza Isaias and Randal Willars Valdez	408.39

=== Women's events ===
Event	Gold		Silver		Bronze	
3m springboard	Chen Yiwen; China	344.15	Sayaka Mikami; Japan	342.60	Chang Yani; China	318.50
10m platform	Chen Yuxi; China	420.30	Quan Hongchan; China	408.10	Andrea Spendolini-Sirieix; Great Britain	298.70
Synchronized; 3m Springboard	China; Chang Yani and Chen Yiwen	311.19	Canada; Mia Vallee and Pamela Ware	286.60	United States; Sarah Bacon and Kassidy Cook	284.52
Synchronized; 10m Platform	China; Chen Yuxi and Quan Hongchan	362.76	Canada; Caeli McKay and Kate Miller	288.00	United Kingdom; Lois Toulson and Andrea Spendolini Sireix	285.90

=== Medal table ===
* Host nation (Germany)

Rank	Nation	Gold	Silver	Bronze	Total
1	China	8	1	1	10
2	Canada	1	2	0	3
3	Australia	0	2	0	2
4	Great Britain	0	1	4	5
5	Germany*	0	1	0	1
5	Japan	0	1	0	1
5	Ukraine	0	1	0	1
8	United States	0	0	2	2
9	Italy	0	0	1	1
9	Mexico	0	0	1	1
Totals (10 entries)		9	9	9	27

== Participating countries ==
A total of 18 countries have confirmed to participate in the event

- Australia (10)
- Brazil (2)
- Canada (6)
- China (8)
- France (4)
- Great Britain (10)
- Germany (7)
- Italy (5)
- Jamaica (1)
- Japan (3)
- Mexico (2)
- Norway (1)
- New Zealand (1)
- Poland (1)
- Spain (4)
- Switzerland (1)
- Ukraine (6)
- United States (10)
