= 2022 FINA Diving World Cup =

International diving competition

- Host city: Berlin, Germany
- Date: October 20–23, 2022
- Nations: 13
- Website: FINA event page

The 2022 FINA Diving World Cup was scheduled to take place in Berlin, Germany, from 20 to 23 October 2022. It was to be the 23rd edition of the biennial diving competition, and the first time this specific FINA event was to be held in Berlin and Germany.

== Schedule ==
All times are local Central European Time (UTC+1) and based on approximate entry numbers. They will be subject to revision.

Day	Date	Event	Time
1	Oct 20	3m Prelims (Women's)	9:00
1	Oct 20	3m Prelims (Men's)	11:00
1	Oct 20	10m Prelims (Women's)	14:00
1	Oct 20	10m Prelims (Men's)	15:30
2	Oct 21	10m Synchro Finals (Women's)	13:00
2	Oct 21	10m Synchro Finals (Men's)	14:10
2	Oct 21	3m Finals (Men's)	15:15
3	Oct 22	3m Synchro Finals (Women's)	13:00
3	Oct 22	3m Synchro Finals (Men's)	14:05
3	Oct 22	10m Finals (Women's)	15:15
4	Oct 23	3m Finals (Women's)	14:08
4	Oct 23	10m Finals (Men's)	14:41
4	Oct 23	Mixed 3m & 10m Team Finals	16:28

== Medal summary ==
=== Men's events ===
Event	Gold		Silver		Bronze	
3m springboard	China; Wang Zongyuan	562.20	China; Cao Yuan	513.85	Germany; Moritz Wesemann	432.40
10m platform	China; Yang Jian	537.70	China; Yang Hao	472.20	United States; Brandon Loschiavo	429.95
Synchronized; 3m Springboard	China; Wang Zongyuan and Cao Yuan	442.68	United States; Greg Duncan and Tyler Downs	354.00	Australia; Lachlan Cronin and Li Shixin	349.41
Synchronized; 10m Platform	China; Yang Hao and Lian Junije	444.84	Germany; Lou Noel Guy Massenberg and Timo Barthel	345.33	Colombia; Sebastián Villa and Alejandro Solarte	335.88

=== Women's events ===
Event	Gold		Silver		Bronze	
3m springboard	Chang Yani; China	363.75	Chen Yiwen; China	346.95	Sayaka Mikami; Japan	287.05
10m platform	Chen Yuxi; China	449.85	Quan Hongchan; China	430.45	Nike Agunbiade; United States	298.70
Synchronized; 3m Springboard	China; Chang Yani and Chen Yiwen	330.03	Germany; Saskia Oettinghaus and Jana Lisa Rother	272.94	United States; Kristen Hayden and Brooke Shultz	257.97
Synchronized; 10m Platform	China; Chen Yuxi and Quan Hongchan	349.80	United States; Katrina Young and Nike Agunbiade	261.54		

=== Medal table ===
* Host nation (Germany)

Rank	Nation	Gold	Silver	Bronze	Total
1	China	8	4	0	12
2	United States	1	2	3	6
3	Germany*	0	3	1	4
4	Australia	0	0	2	2
5	Colombia	0	0	1	1
5	Japan	0	0	1	1
Totals (6 entries)		9	9	8	26

== Participating countries ==
A total of 13 countries have confirmed to participate in the event

- Australia (5)
- Brazil (5)
- Canada (3)
- China (9)
- Colombia (6)
- France (1)
- Georgia (2)
- Germany (7)
- Jamaica (2)
- Japan (1)
- Malaysia (3)
- Romania (1)
- United States (12)
