= Diving at the 2024 World Aquatics Championships – Women's 3 metre springboard =

Women's 3 metre springboard at the 2024 World Aquatics Championships
- Venue: Hamad Aquatic Centre
- Location: Doha, Qatar
- Dates: 8 February (preliminary); 9 February (semifinal and final)
- Competitors: 53 from 35 nations
- Winning points: 354.75

Medalists
gold medal	Chang Yani	China
silver medal	Chen Yiwen	China
bronze medal	Kim Su-ji	South Korea

The Women's 3 metre springboard competition at the 2024 World Aquatics Championships was held on 8 and 9 February 2024.

== Results ==
The preliminary round was started on 8 February at 10:02. The semifinal was started on 9 February at 10:02. The final was started on 9 February at 18:32.

Green denotes finalists

Blue denotes semifinalists

Rank	Diver	Nationality	Preliminary		Semifinal		Final	
Rank	Diver	Nationality	Points	Rank	Points	Rank	Points	Rank
1st place, gold medalist(s)	Chang Yani	China	290.90	4	332.25	2	354.75	1
2nd place, silver medalist(s)	Chen Yiwen	China	297.75	2	354.75	1	336.60	2
3rd place, bronze medalist(s)	Kim Su-ji	South Korea	257.55	15	302.10	3	311.25	3
4	Maddison Keeney	Australia	304.45	1	294.80	5	302.95	4
5	Sarah Bacon	United States	297.45	3	273.45	11	302.65	5
6	Lena Hentschel	Germany	267.45	12	282.15	9	289.95	6
7	Aranza Vázquez	Mexico	283.80	5	291.40	6	284.10	7
8	Grace Reid	Great Britain	282.55	6	283.80	7	284.00	8
9	Julia Vincent	South Africa	247.80	16	280.90	10	279.40	9
10	Chiara Pellacani	Italy	274.95	10	302.10	3	272.05	10
11	Haruka Enomoto	Japan	258.50	14	282.40	8	265.20	11
12	Viktoriya Kesar	Ukraine	276.30	8	262.70	12	208.25	12
13	Sayaka Mikami	Japan	279.45	7	258.70	13	Did not advance	
14	Alysha Koloi	Australia	276.20	9	252.30	14	Did not advance	
15	Saskia Oettinghaus	Germany	268.65	11	241.35	15	Did not advance	
16	Prisis Ruiz	Cuba	262.35	13	229.90	16	Did not advance	
17	María Papworth	Spain	246.10	18	224.90	17	Did not advance	
18	Elena Bertocchi	Italy	247.00	17	194.15	18	Did not advance	
19	Helle Tuxen	Norway	246.00	19	Did not advance			
20	Anisley García	Cuba	245.40	20	Did not advance			
21	Elizabeth Roussel	New Zealand	243.00	21	Did not advance			
22	Alejandra Estudillo	Mexico	241.80	22	Did not advance			
23	Yasmin Harper	Great Britain	238.80	23	Did not advance			
24	Nur Dhabitah Sabri	Malaysia	238.15	24	Did not advance			
25	Pamela Ware	Canada	238.10	25	Did not advance			
26	Maha Amer	Egypt	233.05	26	Did not advance			
27	Aleksandra Błażowska	Poland	228.75	27	Did not advance			
28	Lauren Hallaselkä	Finland	228.05	28	Did not advance			
29	Mia Vallée	Canada	226.45	29	Did not advance			
30	Madeline Coquoz	Switzerland	225.90	30	Did not advance			
31	Gladies Lariesa Garina Haga	Indonesia	225.15	31	Did not advance			
32	Elna Widerström	Sweden	224.55	32	Did not advance			
33	Michelle Heimberg	Switzerland	224.40	33	Did not advance			
34	Sude Köprülü	Turkey	222.75	34	Did not advance			
35	Luana Lira	Brazil	219.40	35	Did not advance			
36	Tereza Jelínková	Czech Republic	218.95	36	Did not advance			
37	Ashlee Tan	Singapore	217.20	37	Did not advance			
38	Ng Yan Yee	Malaysia	216.00	38	Did not advance			
39	Elizabeth Pérez	Venezuela	215.25	39	Did not advance			
40	Kaja Skrzek	Poland	214.70	40	Did not advance			
41	Lauren Burch	Puerto Rico	206.60	41	Did not advance			
42	Bailey Heydra	South Africa	206.40	42	Did not advance			
43	Kwon Ha-lim	South Korea	204.95	43	Did not advance			
44	Clare Cryan	Ireland	199.05	44	Did not advance			
45	Estilla Mosena	Hungary	194.80	45	Did not advance			
46	Rocío Velázquez	Spain	193.35	46	Did not advance			
47	Anna Santos	Brazil	192.00	47	Did not advance			
48	Victoria Garza	Dominican Republic	185.00	48	Did not advance			
49	Naïs Gillet	France	182.80	49	Did not advance			
50	Chan Tsz Ming	Hong Kong	174.80	50	Did not advance			
51	Ivana Medková	Czech Republic	136.20	51	Did not advance			
52	Palak Sharma	India	127.25	52	Did not advance			
	Patrícia Kun	Hungary	Did not finish		Did not advance			
