= Diving at the 2026 Asian Games – Women's 3 metre springboard =

Diving competition

Women's 3 metre springboard at the 2026 Asian Games
- Venue: Tokyo Aquatics Centre
- Date: 30 September 2026
- Competitors: 10 from 6 nations

Medalists
gold medal	Chen Yiwen	China
silver medal	Chen Jia	China
bronze medal	Sayaka Mikami	Japan

The women's 3 metre springboard competition at the 2026 Asian Games took place on 30 September 2026 at Tokyo Aquatics Centre.

== Schedule ==
All times are Japan Standard Time (UTC+09:00)

Date	Time	Event
Wednesday, 30 September 2026	10:00	Preliminary
Wednesday, 30 September 2026	15:20	Final

== Results ==
=== Preliminary ===
Rank	Athlete	Dive					Total
Rank	Athlete	1	2	3	4	5	Total
1	Chen Jia (CHN)	66.00	69.75	75.00	67.50	69.00	347.25
2	Chen Yiwen (CHN)	67.50	69.00	72.00	65.10	72.00	345.60
3	Sayaka Mikami (JPN)	61.50	63.55	51.00	60.00	66.00	302.05
4	Kim Su-ji (KOR)	49.50	44.95	52.50	58.50	48.00	253.45
5	Ong Ker Ying (MAS)	39.60	49.50	48.00	43.50	45.00	225.60
6	Lee Ye-joo (KOR)	40.50	47.60	49.50	33.60	51.80	223.00
7	Chan Tsz Ming (HKG)	48.60	42.00	42.00	40.30	45.00	217.90
8	Lee Yiat Qing (MAS)	46.80	44.80	33.60	42.00	45.00	212.20
9	Barbara Chen (TPE)	39.60	25.20	42.00	24.30	34.80	165.90
10	Jacqueline Chen (TPE)	38.40	29.40	29.40	32.40	33.75	163.35

=== Final ===
Rank	Athlete	Dive					Total
Rank	Athlete	1	2	3	4	5	Total
1st place, gold medalist(s)	Chen Yiwen (CHN)	63.00	72.00	72.00	79.05	72.00	358.05
2nd place, silver medalist(s)	Chen Jia (CHN)	63.00	75.95	72.00	60.00	76.50	347.45
3rd place, bronze medalist(s)	Sayaka Mikami (JPN)	63.00	72.85	66.00	63.00	67.50	332.35
4	Kim Su-ji (KOR)	54.00	60.45	54.00	58.50	55.50	282.45
5	Chan Tsz Ming (HKG)	49.95	36.00	54.00	40.30	48.00	228.25
6	Lee Ye-joo (KOR)	48.60	35.00	42.00	49.00	50.40	225.00
7	Ong Ker Ying (MAS)	42.00	45.00	45.00	42.00	42.00	216.00
8	Lee Yiat Qing (MAS)	49.50	22.50	46.20	27.90	58.50	204.60
9	Jacqueline Chen (TPE)	30.00	29.40	33.60	41.85	30.00	164.85
10	Barbara Chen (TPE)	39.60	36.40	26.60	33.75	25.20	161.55
