= 2012 United States Olympic trials (diving) =

2012 U.S. Olympic trials (diving)
- Host city: Federal Way, Washington, United States
- Date: June 17- June 23
- Venue: Weyerhaeuser King County Aquatic Center
- Events: 7

The 2012 U.S. Olympic diving team trials were held from June 17 to June 23, 2012, hosted by USA Diving, at the Weyerhaeuser King County Aquatic Center in Federal Way, Washington.

== U.S. Olympic team ==
The following divers have qualified to compete for the United States at the 2012 Summer Olympics:

Men

Diver	Individual		Synchronized	
Chris Colwill	3 m springboard			
Troy Dumais	3 m springboard		3 m springboard	
David Boudia		10 m platform		10 m platform
Nick McCrory		10 m platform		10 m platform
Kristian Ipsen			3 m springboard	

Women

Diver	Individual		Synchronized
Cassidy Krug	3 m springboard		
Christina Loukas	3 m springboard		
Katherine Bell		10 m platform	
Brittany Viola		10 m platform	
Kelci Bryant			3 m springboard
Abigail Johnston			3 m springboard

== Results ==
=== Men's events ===
Event	Gold		Silver		Bronze	
Synchronized men platform	Nick McCrory / David Boudia	1387.86	Toby Stanley / Steele Johnson	1207.08	Steele Johnson / Dashiell Enos	1170.12
Synchronized men 3m springboard	Troy Dumais / Kristian Ipsen	1296.21	Christopher Colwill / Drew Livingston	1263.51	Justin Dumais / Dwight Dumais	1151.46
Men 10m platform	David Boudia	1642.40	Nick McCrory	1582.55	Thomas Finchum	1463.20
Men 3m springboard	Chris Colwill	1457.45	Troy Dumais	1448.35	Kristian Ipsen	1447.10

=== Women's events ===
Event	Gold		Silver		Bronze	
Synchronized women 10m platform	Ashley Buchter / Natalie Kalibat	701.73	Allie Alter / Andrea Acquista	699.27	—N/a	
Synchronized women 3m springboard	Abigail Johnston / Kelci Bryant	956.40	Kassidy Cook / Christina Loukas	955.98	Amanda Burke / Summer Allman	806.10
Women 3m springboard	Cassidy Krug	1094.85	Christina Loukas	1017.85	Kelci Bryant	967.05
Women 10m platform	Brittany Viola	1081.50	Katie Bell	1024.40	Amy Cozad	1004.00
