= Brandon Loschiavo =

American diver

Personal information
- Full name: Brandon John Loschiavo
- Born: May 31, 1997 (age 29) Huntington Beach, California, U.S.
- Occupation: Diving coach
- Height: 5 ft 6 in (168 cm)

Sport
- Sport: Diving
- Event: Platform specialist
- College team: Purdue University
- Club: Mission Viejo Nadadores
- Coached by: Derek Starks (Nadadores); Adam Soldati (Purdue)
Medal record
Men's diving
Representing the United States
World Cup
Bronze medal – third place	2022 Berlin	10 m platform
Representing the Purdue Boilermakers
NCAA Championships
Gold medal – first place	2021 Greensboro	10 m platform

Brandon John Loschiavo (/ˌloʊʃiˈɑːvoʊ/ LOH-shee-AH-voh; born May 31, 1997) is an American former diver who competed for Purdue University and represented the United States in 10-meter platform diving at both the 2020 Tokyo and 2024 Paris Olympics. He was an NCAA Champion on the 10-meter platform in 2021, and pursued a career as a diving coach after graduating from Purdue.

== Early life ==
Loschiavo was born on May 31, 1997, in Huntingdon Beach, California, the youngest of three siblings to Laura and Steve Loschiavo. He began taking gymnastics at the age of four, following in the footsteps of his mother Laura. Loschiavo's father Steve excelled in track and field, and his mother was a gymnast. Lochiavo had older siblings Michael, who excelled in track, and Amy who excelled in pole-vaulting, with both earning Division I scholarships.

== High School and Mission Viejo Nadadores era ==
After a back injury sidelined him for a while as a gymnast on the parallel bars at age 12, Loschiavo took up diving after attending a summer diving camp in Long Beach, California. He graduated Huntington Beach High School, training as a diver all four years. At age 15, he was practicing both platform and springboard diving with the exceptional program offered by the Mission Viejo Nadadores, where he was coached by Derek Starks. The Mission Viejo facility was around 20 miles Southeast of his Huntington Beach area home. Competing as a 5' 3" High School Freshman in the conference's first meet, Brandon bettered the Sunset League Conference's record for diving points and subsequently captured the title for the League. Competing as a 14 and 15 year-old age group competitor in springboard while in High School in 2011-12, Loschiavo placed first in AAU 3-meter national titles both years, while competing for Long Beach's McCormick Divers Club . Loschiavo may have received some instruction from Debbie Lynn McCormick at McCormick Divers who coached the team in the 2011–12 time frame.

In Sunset League competition in 2013, he competed as the only diver for Huntington Beach High's Swim and Dive team as very few meets open to high school competition featured platform diving, and Loschiavo was trained almost exclusively by the Nadadores. Demonstrating considerable focus, he attended swim practices as often as six days a week throughout High School. At 17, Loschiavo continued to represent California's outstanding Mission Viejo club, while competing in the 10-meter diving semi-finals at the AT&T National Championships in Knoxville, Tennessee in August 2014.

=== Purdue University ===
Loschiavo competed in diving for Purdue University from 2016-2021 under Head diving coach Adam Soldati, taking some time off for Olympic training. Loschiavo graduated from Purdue in 2021 as a Communications major. As a Purdue Senior in the 2020–2021 season, he was an NCAA titlist and elected as an All-American in platform diving, an event in which he excelled. He won the NCAA national title in Platform diving in Greensboro in March 2021, with a score of 469.05 points, making him only the fourth Purdue diver to win an NCAA title, and the first in the Platform event since 2015.

As a junior for Purdue, he was a national champion for USA Diving in the 10-Meter platform, and 10-meter platform synchronized diving, and part of the first team in platform for the Big-10 Conference. As a sophomore in the 2017–18 year, Loschiavo received an honorable mention as an All-America diver in platform, and was a titlist in platform competition for the Big Ten conference. As a freshman in the 2016–2017 season, he was an voted an All American in platform diving.

== International diving highlights ==
Following is a table depicting a few of Loschiavo's career diving highlights prior to the 2020 Olympics, in meets open to international competition.

Event	Points	Medal	Age*	Competition	Comp Country	Date
Men 10m Synchronised	420.66	Bronze	20	FINA/CNSG Diving World Series 2018	CAN	April 27, 2018
Men 10m Platform	442.70	Bronze	21	FINA Diving Grand Prix 2019	USA	April 13, 2019
Men 10m Synchronised	416.04	Silver	21	FINA Diving Grand Prix 2019	USA	April 14, 2019

In other career high points, Loschiavo was a national champion in platform diving in two years. He was a synchro champion in USA Diving competition in five instances, and as noted previously, captured the NCAA platform title in 2021. At the World Championships, he competed in the 10-meter Platform in the three years of 2019, 2023, and 2024. In the 10-meter Platform Synchronized event at the World Championships, he competed in 2017, and 2023.

Loschiavo broke a scaphoid bone on a dive prior to the 2016 Olympic trails, which affected his desire and ability to compete as an Olympian, and an 18-month recovery affected his diving performance. He also had issues with knee injuries during his diving career.

== Olympics ==
=== 2020, 2024 Olympics Trials ===
On June 12, 2021, Loschiavo qualified to represent team USA in the 2020 Summer Olympics, at the 2020 Olympic trials in Indianapolis, competing in the Men's 10m Platform event, placing first in the nationwide competition. Winning the trials by a comfortable margin, his best dive was a 3 1/2 sommersault tuck, and he scored a total of 1421 points awarded by the judges. Loschiavo faced further challenges at the Olympics, however, as the U.S. team was not strongly favored to medal or place highly in the event as a result of stiff international competition.

Finishing second at the U.S. Olympic Trials in Knoxville, Tennessee to Carson Tyler for the 2024 Olympics, he was not originally guaranteed a spot on the Olympic team. The U.S. was not originally awarded a quota spot in the men's 10 m platform for two divers, but a last minute athlete withdrawal led to the U.S. being awarded a quota spot and Loschiavo was added to the U.S. Olympic Diving Team and did compete at the 2024 Paris Olympics in Platform diving.

== 2020 Tokyo Olympics ==
Loschiavo competed in the 2020 Olympics in 10 meter platform diving, for the U.S. team, where he placed 11th overall in the event, and did not make the finals. The event was held in late July 2021, as a result of a delay due to the COVID epidemic. With the American team not expected as a strong medal contender, Chinese divers took both the gold and silver medals, and the best place of an American finisher was Jordan Windle with a ninth place overall.

== 2024 Paris Olympics ==
Loschiavo competed for the U.S. Olympic team at the 2024 Paris Olympics where he finished 17th in Platform diving.

== Coaching ==
Loschiavo served as an assistant coach while at Purdue on a voluntary basis. Immediately after graduation from Purdue, Losvhiavo worked for two years at clubs in Los Angeles including the Trojan Dive Club and briefly served as an assistant coach at Mission Viejo Nadadores. In 2024, he served as an Assistant Dive coach at the University of Missouri, where four of his divers performed well enough to compete at the NCAA national championships.

In May 2025, Loschiavo was announced as an assistant diving coach at the University of Michigan.

=== Honors ===
In his Senior year at Purdue, Loschiavo was a Big 10 conference and gold medalist in platform diving. In the same year, he was the recipient of the Big 10 Medal of Honor and was the Purdue Athlete of the year for male competitors.
