= Diving at the 2023 World Aquatics Championships – Women's synchronized 3 metre springboard =

Women's synchronized 3 metre springboard at the 2023 World Aquatics Championships
- Venue: Fukuoka Prefectural Pool
- Location: Fukuoka, Japan
- Dates: 17 July (preliminary and final)
- Competitors: 36 from 18 nations
- Teams: 18
- Winning points: 341.94

Medalists
gold medal	Chang Yani; Chen Yiwen	China
silver medal	Yasmin Harper; Scarlett Mew Jensen	Great Britain
bronze medal	Elena Bertocchi; Chiara Pellacani	Italy

The women's synchronized 3 metre springboard competition at the 2023 World Aquatics Championships was held on 17 July 2023.

== Results ==
The preliminary round was started at 09:00. The final was held at 15:30.

Green denotes finalists

Rank	Nation	Divers	Preliminary		Final	
Rank	Nation	Divers	Points	Rank	Points	Rank
1st place, gold medalist(s)	China	Chang Yani; Chen Yiwen	327.42	1	341.94	1
2nd place, silver medalist(s)	Great Britain	Yasmin Harper; Scarlett Mew Jensen	294.72	3	296.58	2
3rd place, bronze medalist(s)	Italy	Elena Bertocchi; Chiara Pellacani	277.41	6	285.99	3
4	United States	Sarah Bacon; Kassidy Cook	307.29	2	285.39	4
5	Canada	Mia Vallée; Pamela Ware	275.73	7	284.22	5
6	Australia	Brittany O'Brien; Georgia Sheehan	275.40	8	279.60	6
7	Mexico	Arantxa Chávez; Paola Pineda	282.30	4	274.50	7
8	Malaysia	Ng Yan Yee; Nur Dhabitah Sabri	278.43	5	272.94	8
9	Germany	Lena Hentschel; Jana Rother	261.60	9	272.67	9
10	Netherlands	Inge Janssen; Celine van Duijn	259.80	10	264.00	10
11	Sweden	Emilia Nilsson Garip; Elna Widerström	257.82	11	258.90	11
12	South Korea	Kim Su-ji; Park Ha-reum	255.84	12	194.04	12
13	Brazil	Luana Lira; Anna Santos	240.00	13	Did not advance	
14	France	Jade Gillet; Naïs Gillet	235.44	14	Did not advance	
15	Cuba	Anisley García; Prisis Ruiz	232.80	15	Did not advance	
16	New Zealand	Elizabeth Roussel; Maggie Squire	230.40	16	Did not advance	
17	South Africa	Bailey Heydra; Zalika Methula	220.14	17	Did not advance	
18	Macau	Choi Sut Kuan; Zhao Hang U	181.95	18	Did not advance	

== Paris 2024 Olympic qualification ==
The 3 metre synchronised springboard event was a direct qualification event for the diving program at the 2024 Olympic Games. The top three teams are awarded quota places for the 3 metre synchronised springboard event in Paris.

Qualification event	Qualified NOCs
Women's synchronized 3 metre springboard	China
Women's synchronized 3 metre springboard	Great Britain
Women's synchronized 3 metre springboard	Italy
Total	3 Quotas (6 Divers)
