= Diving at the 2024 Summer Olympics – Women's 3 metre springboard =

Women's 3 metre springboard at the Games of the XXXIII Olympiad
- Venue: Paris Aquatic Centre
- Date: 7 August 2024 (Preliminary); 8 August 2024 (semifinals); 9 August 2024 (Final)
- Competitors: 28 from 19 nations
- Winning total: 376.00

Medalists
1st place, gold medalist(s)		Chen Yiwen	China
2nd place, silver medalist(s)		Maddison Keeney	Australia
3rd place, bronze medalist(s)		Chang Yani	China

The women's 3 metre springboard diving competition at the 2024 Summer Olympics in Paris was held at the Paris Aquatic Centre between 7 and 9 August 2024. It was the 27th appearance of the event, which has been held at every Olympic Games since the 1908 Summer Olympics.

== Competition format ==
The competition was held in three rounds:

- Preliminary round: All divers performed five dives; the top 18 divers advanced to the semi-final.
- Semi-final: The scores of the preliminary round were erased. The 18 remaining divers performed five dives each, and the top 12 divers advanced to the final.
- Final: The semi-final scores were erased. The 12 final divers performed five dives each, and the top three divers win the gold, silver and bronze medals respectively.

Within each round of five dives, at least one dive had to be from each of the five groups (forward, back, reverse, inward, and twisting). Each dive was assigned a degree of difficulty based on somersaults, position, twists, approach, and entry. There was no limit to the degree of difficulty of dives; the most difficult dives calculated in the FINA rulebook (reverse 4 1/2 somersault in pike position and back 4 1/2 somersault in pike position) are 4.7, but competitors could have attempted more difficult dives. Scoring was done by a panel of seven judges. For each dive, each judge gave a score between 0 and 10 with 0.5 point increments. The top two and bottom two scores were discarded. The remaining three scores were summed and multiplied by the degree of difficulty to give a dive score. The five dive scores were summed to give the score for the round.

== Schedule ==
All times are Central European Time (UTC+1)

Date	Time	Round
7 August 2024	15:00	Preliminary
8 August 2024	15:00	Semifinal
9 August 2024	15:00	Final

== Qualification ==
The qualification spots for the women's 3 metre springboard diving event were attributed as follows:

- 2023 World Championships – The top twelve finalists of each individual event obtained a quota place for their NOC at the 2023 World Aquatics Championships, scheduled for July 14 to 30, in Fukuoka, Japan.
- Continental Qualification Tournaments – The winners of each individual event obtained a quota place for their NOC at one of the five continental meets (Africa, the Americas, Asia, Europe, and Oceania) approved by World Aquatics.
- 2024 World Championships – Twelve highest-ranked divers eligible for qualification obtained a quota place for their NOC in each individual event at the 2024 FINA World Championships, scheduled for February 2 to 18, in Doha, Qatar, respecting the two-member country limit and without surpassing the total quota of 136.
- Reallocation – Additional spots were allocated to the eligible divers placed thirteenth and above in their corresponding individual events, respecting the two-member country limit, at the 2024 World Aquatics Championships until they attain the total quota of 136.
- Host nation – As the host country, France reserves four women's spots to be distributed across the individual diving events.

== Results ==
28 divers entered the event representing 19 nations.

Rank	Name	Nation	Preliminary		Semi final		Final					Total
Rank	Name	Nation	Score	Rank	Score	Rank	Dive 1	Dive 2	Dive 3	Dive 4	Dive 5	Total
1st place, gold medalist(s)	Chen Yiwen	China	356.40	1	360.85	1	70.50	76.50	75.00	77.50	76.50	376.00
2nd place, silver medalist(s)	Maddison Keeney	Australia	337.35	2	334.70	2	67.50	67.50	55.50	74.40	78.20	343.10
3rd place, bronze medalist(s)	Chang Yani	China	308.75	4	320.15	4	42.00	69.75	67.50	75.00	64.50	318.75
4	Chiara Pellacani	Italy	297.70	7	324.75	3	52.50	63.00	65.10	66.00	63.00	309.60
5	Yasmin Harper	Great Britain	295.75	9	278.90	12	63.00	58.50	63.00	55.50	65.10	305.10
6	Alejandra Estudillo	Mexico	276.45	17	317.05	5	58.50	60.45	57.00	66.00	60.00	301.95
7	Saskia Oettinghaus	Germany	279.35	15	286.75	9	60.00	58.50	57.35	63.00	58.50	297.35
8	Valeria Antolino	Spain	297.70	7	284.25	10	60.00	60.45	63.00	51.00	58.50	292.95
9	Emilia Nilsson Garip	Sweden	295.20	10	279.60	11	60.00	54.25	54.00	52.65	58.50	279.40
10	Grace Reid	Great Britain	303.25	5	290.05	7	58.50	41.85	54.00	55.50	66.00	275.85
11	Julia Vincent	South Africa	283.50	13	297.30	6	54.00	67.50	66.00	38.75	45.00	271.25
12	Nur Dhabitah Sabri	Malaysia	283.65	12	286.95	8	63.00	60.00	37.50	28.50	55.80	244.80
13	Kim Su-ji	South Korea	285.50	11	272.75	13	Did not advance					
14	Alysha Koloi	Australia	276.60	16	270.60	14	Did not advance					
15	Anisley García	Cuba	272.40	18	264.90	15	Did not advance					
16	Aranza Vázquez	Mexico	321.75	3	248.20	16	Did not advance					
17	Elena Bertocchi	Italy	282.30	14	245.10	17	Did not advance					
18	Haruka Enomoto	Japan	299.10	6	244.20	18	Did not advance					
19	Sarah Bacon	United States	264.40	19	Did not advance							
20	Jette Müller	Germany	262.85	20	Did not advance							
21	Sayaka Mikami	Japan	258.35	21	Did not advance							
22	Margo Erlam	Canada	258.30	22	Did not advance							
23	Helle Tuxen	Norway	257.10	23	Did not advance							
24	Maha Amer	Egypt	250.20	24	Did not advance							
25	Prisis Ruiz	Cuba	239.85	25	Did not advance							
26	Elizabeth Roussel	New Zealand	233.70	26	Did not advance							
27	Viktoriya Kesar	Ukraine	217.75	27	Did not advance							
28	Alison Gibson	United States	198.30	28	Did not advance							
