= Diving at the 2024 Summer Olympics – Women's synchronized 3 metre springboard =

Women's synchronized 3 metre springboard at the Games of the XXXIII Olympiad
- Venue: Paris Aquatics Centre
- Date: 27 July 2024
- Competitors: 16 from 8 nations
- Winning total: 337.68

Medalists
1st place, gold medalist(s)		Chang Yani; Chen Yiwen	China
2nd place, silver medalist(s)		Sarah Bacon; Kassidy Cook	United States
3rd place, bronze medalist(s)		Yasmin Harper; Scarlett Mew Jensen	Great Britain

The women's 3 metre synchronised springboard diving competitions at the 2024 Summer Olympics in Paris ran on 27 July 2024 at the Paris Aquatics Centre. It was the 7th appearance of the event, which has been held at every Olympic Games since the 2000 Summer Olympics.

== Competition format ==
The competition was held in a single round, consisting of each pair performing five dives. Each dive was from a different group (forward, back, reverse, inward, and twisting). The first two dives were given a fixed degree of difficulty of 2.0, regardless of the dive performed. The other three dives were assigned a degree of difficulty based on somersaults, position, twists, approach, and entry. There was no limit to the degree of difficulty of dives; the most difficult dives calculated in the FINA rulebook (reverse 4 1/2 somersault in pike position and back 4 1/2 somersault in pike position) was 4.7, but competitors could attempt more difficult dives. Scoring was done by a panel of eleven judges, with five judges evaluating synchronization and three judges evaluating execution of each individual diver. For each dive, each judge gave a score between 0 and 10 with 0.5 point increments. The top and bottom synchronization scores and the top and bottom execution scores for each diver were discarded. The remaining five scores were summed, multiplied by 3/5, and multiplied by the degree of difficulty to give a dive score. The five dive scores were summed to give the score for the round.

== Schedule ==
All times are Central European time (UTC+1)

Date	Time	Round
27 July 2024	10:00	Final

== Qualification ==
The top 3 teams at the 2023 World Aquatics Championships earned a quota spot for their NOC. France as the host country, was guaranteed a quota spot. The next 4 teams at the 2024 World Aquatics Championships also received a quota spot.

== Results ==
Rank	Divers	Nation	Final					
Rank	Divers	Nation	Dive 1	Dive 2	Dive 3	Dive 4	Dive 5	Points
1st place, gold medalist(s)	Chang Yani; Chen Yiwen	China	52.80	51.00	77.40	79.98	76.50	337.68
2nd place, silver medalist(s)	Sarah Bacon; Kassidy Cook	United States	49.80	51.00	71.10	72.54	70.20	314.64
3rd place, bronze medalist(s)	Yasmin Harper; Scarlett Mew Jensen	Great Britain	50.40	46.20	63.90	71.10	70.68	302.28
4	Elena Bertocchi; Chiara Pellacani	Italy	49.20	45.00	68.40	68.82	62.10	293.52
5	Maddison Keeney; Anabelle Smith	Australia	47.40	48.00	73.80	74.40	48.60	292.20
6	Lena Hentschel; Jette Müller	Germany	48.60	48.00	64.80	67.89	59.40	288.69
7	Viktoriya Kesar; Anna Pysmenska	Ukraine	45.60	42.00	57.60	54.87	51.30	251.37
8	Naïs Gillet; Juliette Landi	France	42.00	43.80	48.72	51.24	54.27	240.03
