= Katie Bell (diver) =

American diver

Personal information
- Born: February 5, 1988 (age 38) Columbus, Ohio
- Height: 150 cm (4 ft 11 in)
- Weight: 43 kg (95 lb)

Sport
- Country: United States
- Sport: Diving
- Event: 10 m
- College team: Ohio State University
- Club: Ohio State Diving
- Coached by: Vince Panzano

Katie Bell (born February 5, 1988) is an American diver from Columbus, Ohio.

Bell competed in the Women's 10 m platform event at the 2012 Summer Olympics. She qualified for her place after classifying 2nd in the 2012 United States Trials, behind teammate Brittany Viola. After reaching ninth place in the preliminary round, she only managed to attain the 16th position in the semifinal and hence was eliminated from the event.

== Early life ==
Bell was born three weeks prematurely and weighed only three pounds and four ounces. She was not expected to survive infancy. She was gravely injured in 2007 after flubbing a dive and landing on her stomach, sustaining a punctured lung, separated chest cartilage, and dislocated ribs.
