= 2012 United States Olympic Trials =

2012 United States Olympic Trials may refer to:

- 2012 United States Olympic Trials (Diving)
- 2012 United States Olympic Trials (swimming)
- 2012 United States Olympic Trials (track and field)
