= Diving at the 2022 Asian Games – Women's synchronized 3 metre springboard =

Diving competition

Women's synchronized 3 metre springboard at the 2022 Asian Games
- Venue: Hangzhou Olympic Expo Aquatics Center
- Date: 1 October 2023
- Competitors: 10 from 5 nations

Medalists
gold medal	Chen Yiwen; Chang Yani	China
silver medal	Ng Yan Yee; Nur Dhabitah Sabri	Malaysia
bronze medal	Park Ha-reum; Kim Su-ji	South Korea

The women's synchronized 3 metre springboard competition at the 2022 Asian Games took place on 1 October 2023 at Hangzhou Olympic Expo Center.

== Schedule ==
All times are China Standard Time (UTC+08:00)

Date	Time	Event
Sunday, 1 October 2023	17:30	Final

== Results ==
Rank	Team	Dive					Total
Rank	Team	1	2	3	4	5	Total
1st place, gold medalist(s)	China (CHN); Chen Yiwen; Chang Yani	53.40	54.00	76.50	75.33	76.50	335.73
2nd place, silver medalist(s)	Malaysia (MAS); Ng Yan Yee; Nur Dhabitah Sabri	47.40	36.60	68.40	54.87	63.00	270.27
3rd place, bronze medalist(s)	South Korea (KOR); Park Ha-reum; Kim Su-ji	44.40	43.80	56.28	57.96	51.12	253.56
4	Singapore (SGP); Fong Kay Yian; Ashlee Tan	42.00	39.60	44.64	58.32	47.88	232.44
5	Macau (MAC); Zhao Hang U Choi Sut Kuan	37.80	37.20	39.69	37.44	38.16	190.29
