= Diving at the 2026 Asian Games – Women's synchronized 3 metre springboard =

Diving competition

Women's synchronized 3 metre springboard at the 2026 Asian Games
- Venue: Tokyo Aquatics Centre
- Date: 27 September 2026
- Competitors: 14 from 7 nations

Medalists
gold medal	Chen Yiwen; Chen Jia	China
silver medal	Kim Su-ji; Kim Na-hyun	South Korea
bronze medal	Ong Ker Ying; Lee Yiat Qing	Malaysia

The women's synchronized 3 metre springboard competition at the 2026 Asian Games took place on 26 September 2026 at Tokyo Aquatics Centre.

== Schedule ==
All times are Japan Standard Time (UTC+09:00)

Date	Time	Event
Sunday, 27 September 2026	10:00	Final

== Results ==
Rank	Team	Dive					Total
Rank	Team	1	2	3	4	5	Total
1st place, gold medalist(s)	China (CHN); Chen Yiwen; Chen Jia	50.40	51.60	72.00	76.26	78.30	328.56
2nd place, silver medalist(s)	South Korea (KOR); Kim Su-ji; Kim Na-hyun	46.80	46.80	59.40	44.10	57.60	254.70
3rd place, bronze medalist(s)	Malaysia (MAS); Ong Ker Ying; Lee Yiat Qing	43.20	41.40	51.12	55.80	52.20	243.72
4	Hong Kong (HKG); Chan Tsz Ming; Leung Ka Sin	38.40	40.20	48.96	50.22	46.20	223.98
5	Chinese Taipei (TPE); Barbara Chen; Jacqueline Chen	39.60	37.80	44.64	47.04	50.22	219.30
6	Singapore (SGP); Sophia Tan; Alexandra Yeo	39.60	36.00	44.55	46.20	36.96	203.31
7	Macau (MAC); Zhao Hang U Pou Sin Lam	32.40	29.40	34.56	39.69	30.00	166.05
