= Adam Soldati =

American diving coach (born 1974)

Biographical details
- Born: January 25, 1974
- Height: 5 ft 10 in (178 cm)
- Weight: 175 lb (79 kg)
- Education: Indiana University Bloomington

Playing career
- 1994–1997: Indiana University Bloomington (1997); Coach Jeff Huber
- 2000–2002: Woodlands Athletic Club
- Position: Diver

Coaching career (HC unless noted)
- 1997–2000: Indiana University Bloomington Assistant Coach; Indiana Diving, Youth Development
- 2003–2005: Woodlands Athletic Club
- 2005–2024: Purdue University

Accomplishments and honors

Awards
- National Scholastic and Collegiate Trophy (2025); 5xCSCAA National Coach of the Year (2009–2011, 2015, 2017); CSCAA List of 100 Greatest Coaches

Adam Soldati (born January 25, 1974) was an American competitive diver for Indiana University Bloomington and a diving coach for Purdue University from 2005-2024, where he produced fourteen NCAA champions, twenty-two titlists in Big Ten Conference championships, and just over 120 NCAA All Americans. Soldati trained three U.S. Olympians in his career including 2016 Olympic silver medalist in 10-meter synchro Steele Johnson, 2020 and 2024 10-meter platform Olympic competitor Brandon Loschiavo and four-time ten meter Olympic platform medalist David Boudia.

== Early life ==
Soldati was born on January 25, 1974, and attended Sonoma Valley High School, graduating in 1992, where he competed in diving under Sonoma Valley's head swim and dive coach Mike Hoppe. A strong regional program, Sonoma's swim and diving team went undefeated in dual meets from 1990 to 1992. Competing as a senior in May 1992, Soldati placed first at the Sonoma County League Diving Finals in Petaluma, California. He started diving by his junior year in high school, where he won the California Junior State Championship. In June 1992, of his high school senior year, he was voted to the All Empire Conference team as a diver.

A multi-sport athlete, at 5' 10" and 175 pounds, Soldati showed speed as a wide receiver and defensive back for Sonoma's football team, and served as a back-up quarterback in 1990. He was named a Sonoma County League Football All-Star by the Press-Democrat in August 1992, and in the off-season played basketball for Sonoma.

== Indiana University ==
Swimming for the Indiana Hoosiers from 1993 to 1997, Soldati trained under head diving coach Dr. Jeff Huber. Excelling in his sport, Soldati was an All Big Ten Conference diver for Indiana in each of the three years from 1995 to 1997. Diving coach Huber invited Soldati to stay on as Indiana's assistant diving coach when Soldati graduated Indiana in 1997. A high achiever in collegiate diving, Huber was the U.S. Olympic diving coach for the 2000 Olympics.

== Coaching diving ==
Around 1998, after his senior year at Indiana, in addition to serving as an assistant diving coach Soldati founded the Indiana Diving and Youth Development Program with his future wife Kimiko Hirai. Both as a diver and an assistant coach, Soldati benefited greatly from his time with Indiana diving coach Huber. Moving to Texas around 2001, Soldati began a business career in the Houston area after his marriage while training with Houston's Woodlands Athletic Club under head coach Kenny Armstrong. Soldati coached for the Woodlands Athletic Club for a few years when a coaching position became available, before accepting his position at Purdue.

Soldati married 2004 Athens U.S. Olympic diver Hirai, formerly of Colorado, in May 2000, and they have six children. They met as divers for Indiana University.

== Purdue University ==
Soldati accepted a position as head diving coach at Purdue in June 2005, where he continued through 2024, with his wife Kimiko serving as an assistant volunteer coach. In his career, Soldati mentored three American Olympic medalists including Steele Johnson, Brandon Loschiavo and four-time Olympic medalist David Boudia. He trained over forty swimmers who became medalists in international competition and 34 American national champions. In collegiate competition, he had fourteen NCAA champions. In conference tournaments, he has had twenty-two titlists in Big Ten Conference championships, and has coached just over 120 collegiate NCAA All-Americans. Recognition bestowed on his divers have included nine with Big Ten Diver of the Year honors and five with NCAA Diver of the Year honors. He retired as Purdue head diving coach after being diagnosed with ALS in early 2024, and was replaced by his former swimmer and Olympian David Boudia. In a transitional role, Soldati served as "director of diving" for a period.

== Honors ==
During his coaching tenure at Purdue, the College Swimming & Diving Coaches Association of America honored Soldati as the National Coach of the Year in 2009, 2010, 2011, 2015 and 2017, a total of five times in his career. He was named to the list of the 100 greatest coaches of the last 100 years by the CSCAA, among 500 nominees.

In February 2025, Soldati was elected to receive the National Scholastic and Collegiate Trophy from the College Swimming and Diving Coaches Association of America.
