= Diving at the 2018 Asian Games – Women's 1 metre springboard =

Women's 1 metre springboard at the 2018 Asian Games
- Venue: Gelora Bung Karno Aquatic Stadium
- Date: 31 August 2018
- Competitors: 12 from 7 nations

Medalists
gold medal	Wang Han	China
silver medal	Chen Yiwen	China
bronze medal	Kim Su-ji	South Korea

The women's 1 metre springboard competition at the 2018 Asian Games took place on 31 August 2018 at the Gelora Bung Karno Aquatic Stadium.

== Schedule ==
All times are Western Indonesia Time (UTC+07:00)

Date	Time	Event
Friday, 31 August 2018	11:55	Preliminary
Friday, 31 August 2018	19:15	Final

== Results ==
=== Preliminary ===
Rank	Athlete	Dive					Total
Rank	Athlete	1	2	3	4	5	Total
1	Wang Han (CHN)	61.20	65.00	57.50	57.60	66.30	307.60
2	Chen Yiwen (CHN)	58.80	55.20	60.00	68.90	62.40	305.30
3	Kim Su-ji (KOR)	52.80	54.60	48.30	54.00	47.30	257.00
4	Nur Dhabitah Sabri (MAS)	50.40	46.80	49.45	51.60	54.60	252.85
5	Kim Kwang-hui (PRK)	49.20	48.30	46.80	54.60	45.00	243.90
6	Kim Na-mi (KOR)	50.40	35.10	51.75	50.40	49.50	237.15
7	Minami Itahashi (JPN)	50.40	46.20	44.85	39.60	54.60	235.65
8	Kim Mi-hwa (PRK)	51.60	46.00	32.40	52.00	38.85	220.85
9	Leong Mun Yee (MAS)	50.40	46.80	46.00	20.40	46.80	210.40
10	Della Dinarsari Harimurti (INA)	37.80	45.50	42.55	44.40	39.60	209.85
11	Eka Purnama Indah (INA)	40.95	39.00	44.85	27.60	44.40	196.80
12	Chan Lam (HKG)	38.50	44.40	33.00	31.00	31.50	178.40

=== Final ===
Rank	Athlete	Dive					Total
Rank	Athlete	1	2	3	4	5	Total
1st place, gold medalist(s)	Wang Han (CHN)	63.60	68.90	60.95	61.20	68.90	323.55
2nd place, silver medalist(s)	Chen Yiwen (CHN)	61.20	55.20	58.80	65.00	66.30	306.50
3rd place, bronze medalist(s)	Kim Su-ji (KOR)	55.20	57.20	49.45	54.00	49.50	265.35
4	Nur Dhabitah Sabri (MAS)	55.20	58.50	49.45	49.20	50.70	263.05
5	Kim Na-mi (KOR)	54.00	35.10	48.30	46.80	46.20	230.40
6	Minami Itahashi (JPN)	51.60	45.10	37.95	40.80	50.70	226.15
7	Kim Mi-hwa (PRK)	50.40	41.40	44.40	46.80	43.05	226.05
8	Leong Mun Yee (MAS)	50.40	50.70	34.50	39.60	49.40	224.60
9	Eka Purnama Indah (INA)	42.00	44.20	42.55	43.20	50.40	222.35
10	Kim Kwang-hui (PRK)	51.60	37.95	13.20	48.10	46.25	197.10
11	Della Dinarsari Harimurti (INA)	31.50	39.00	41.40	39.60	37.20	188.70
12	Chan Lam (HKG)	29.70	40.80	30.80	30.00	18.90	150.20
