= Diving at the 2024 World Aquatics Championships – Women's synchronized 3 metre springboard =

Women's synchronized 3 metre springboard at the 2024 World Aquatics Championships
- Venue: Hamad Aquatic Centre
- Location: Doha, Qatar
- Dates: 7 February
- Competitors: 36 from 18 nations
- Teams: 18
- Winning points: 323.43

Medalists
gold medal	Chang Yani; Chen Yiwen	China
silver medal	Maddison Keeney; Anabelle Smith	Australia
bronze medal	Yasmin Harper; Scarlett Mew Jensen	Great Britain

The Women's synchronized 3 metre springboard competition at the 2024 World Aquatics Championships was held on 7 February 2024.

== Results ==
The final was held at 13:02.

Rank	Nation	Divers	Points
1st place, gold medalist(s)	China	Chang Yani; Chen Yiwen	323.43
2nd place, silver medalist(s)	Australia	Maddison Keeney; Anabelle Smith	300.45
3rd place, bronze medalist(s)	Great Britain	Yasmin Harper; Scarlett Mew Jensen	281.70
4	United States	Alison Gibson; Krysta Palmer	279.30
5	Ukraine	Viktoriya Kesar; Hanna Pysmenska	277.47
6	Germany	Lena Hentschel; Jette Müller	273.93
7	Mexico	Arantxa Chávez; Paola Pineda	269.55
8	Italy	Elena Bertocchi; Chiara Pellacani	260.28
9	Malaysia	Ng Yan Yee; Nur Dhabitah Sabri	258.30
10	South Korea	Kim Su-ji; Kwon Ha-lim	257.10
11	Netherlands	Inge Jansen; Celine van Duijn	255.30
12	Sweden	Emma Gullstrand; Elna Widerström	233.46
13	Brazil	Luana Lira; Anna Santos	230.70
14	France	Jade Gillet; Naïs Gillet	224.88
15	Canada	Mia Vallée; Pamela Ware	201.27
16	Czech Republic	Tereza Jelínková; Ivana Medková	180.24
17	Georgia	Mariam Shanidze; Tekle Sharia	176.97
18	Macau	Wong Cho Yi; Zhao Hang U	147.78
