= Natalie Kalibat =

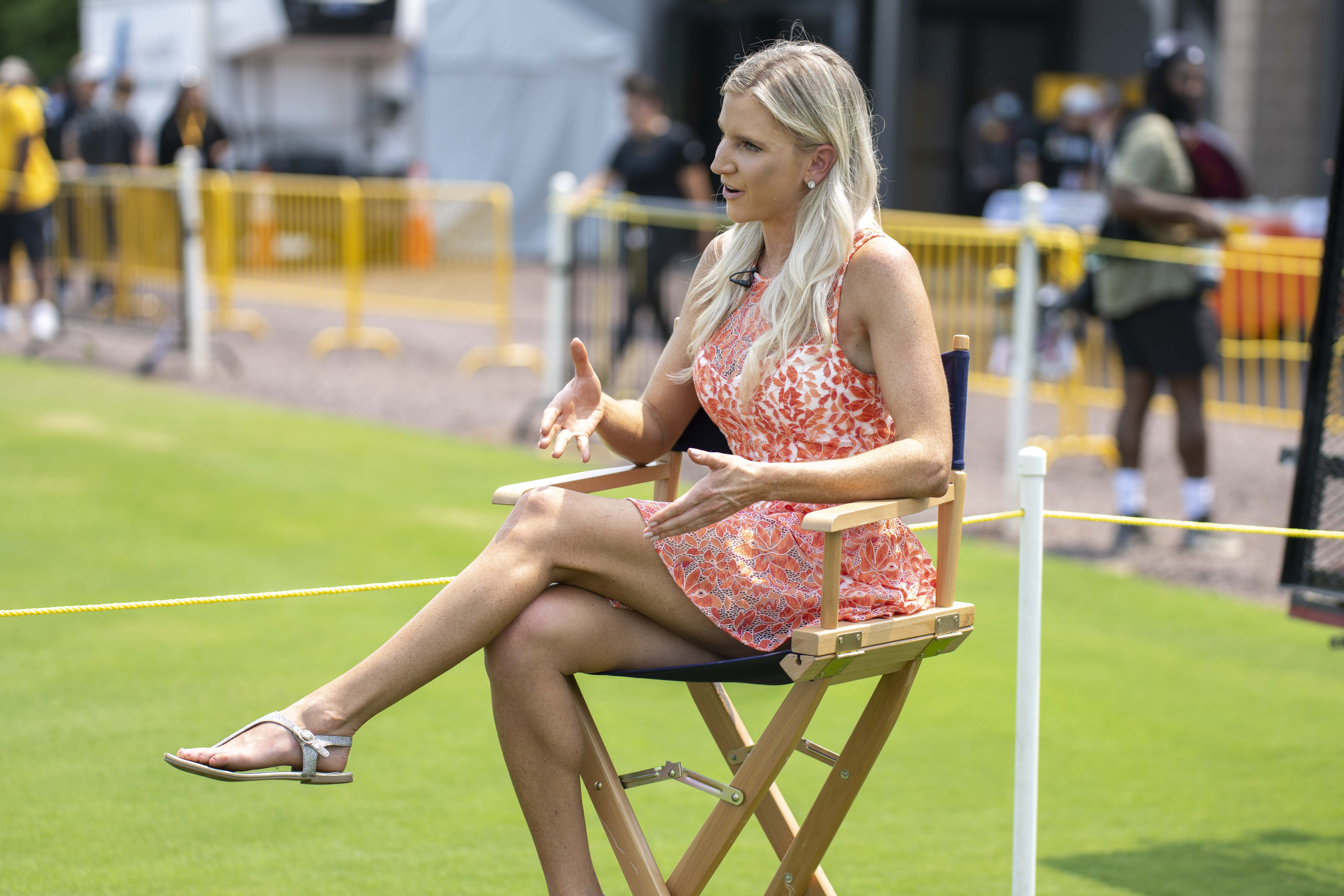
- Kalibat in 2021
- Born: Princeton, New Jersey
- Education: University of Southern California
- Occupations: Sportscaster, journalist
- Years active: 2016-present
- Spouse: Rich Witten
- Website: nataliekalibat.com

Natalie Kalibat is an American sportscaster, journalist and television personality who is currently doing live sports broadcasts as a play-by-play announcer, color analyst, and reporter for ESPN and other sports networks. She is the host of the "Diving in Deep" podcast.

== Early life ==
Kalibat grew up in Princeton, New Jersey.

Kalibat won the 2012 United States Olympic Trials for diving in the Synchronized Women 10m Platform event and won 1-meter, 3-meter and platform AAU titles in 2012. She qualified for Olympic trials while a senior in high school.

== Diving and college ==
She was a diver at the University of Southern California and was part of the 2016 Pac-12 championship team, the first in program history. She graduated from the Annenberg School for Communication and Journalism.

While at USC, Kalibat interned for ESPN, Pac-12 Networks and KNBC.

== Career ==
She was hired as the weekend sports anchor at WBOY-TV in Clarksburg, West Virginia in July 2016 before moving to WRIC-TV in December 2017. Kalibat covered the Washington Football Team during their training camp in Richmond. She also covered the NASCAR Cup Series at Richmond Raceway.

She works as a play-by-play broadcaster for USA Diving and World Aquatics diving and high diving events on ESPN and Peacock.

She has worked as a diving analyst for Big Ten Network at the 2018 championships and ESPN covering the Big 12 diving championships in 2020-2026 on ESPN+.

She was the diving analyst and reporter for the 2024-2026 American Athletic Conference championships. and the diving analyst for the 2024 Sun Belt Conference championships., with both airing on ESPN+.

She is a sideline reporter for ESPN's college football coverage.

Witten also does play-by-play for USL Super League women's soccer.

She is also a color analyst for FIU Panthers football radio broadcasts, a sideline reporter for FIU men's and women's basketball and FAU Owls basketball, softball and volleyball broadcasts.

She was the sideline reporter for the 2024 Conference USA women's soccer tournament and 2025 volleyball tournament.

She was the play-by-play broadcaster for the 2022 Northeast Conference women's lacrosse championships. Kalibat served as the sideline reporter for the 2022 Ivy League women's lacrosse championships, 2026 Big 12 lacrosse championships and the 2022 NCAA women's lacrosse tournament games held at Princeton.

She also currently calls swimming and diving for ACC Network Extra starting in 2019, the Ivy League on ESPN and FloSwimming and swimming & diving and women's lacrosse for the Atlantic 10 on ESPN.

She broadcast women's basketball, softball and women's lacrosse for the Big South on ESPN and is a hockey analyst for the Ivy League on ESPN, a basketball sideline reporter for Conference USA on ESPN+ and NXT Level Sports and a lacrosse and softball analyst for the American Athletic Conference on ESPN+.

== Family ==
Her mother Rebecca, sister Kristiana and brother Peter were all college swimmers, with Rebecca competing at University of Mary Washington, Kristiana at Wagner College and Peter at Georgetown University. Natalie got engaged to then-VCU assistant baseball coach Rich Witten in 2019. The two were married at Saint Paul's Catholic Church in Princeton on December 18, 2021. The reception was held at Jasna Polana.

Rich Witten is now the head baseball coach at Florida International University.
