= Weyerhaeuser King County Aquatic Center =

Aquatic facility in Federal Way, Washington

Coordinates: 47.295366°N 122.343318°W

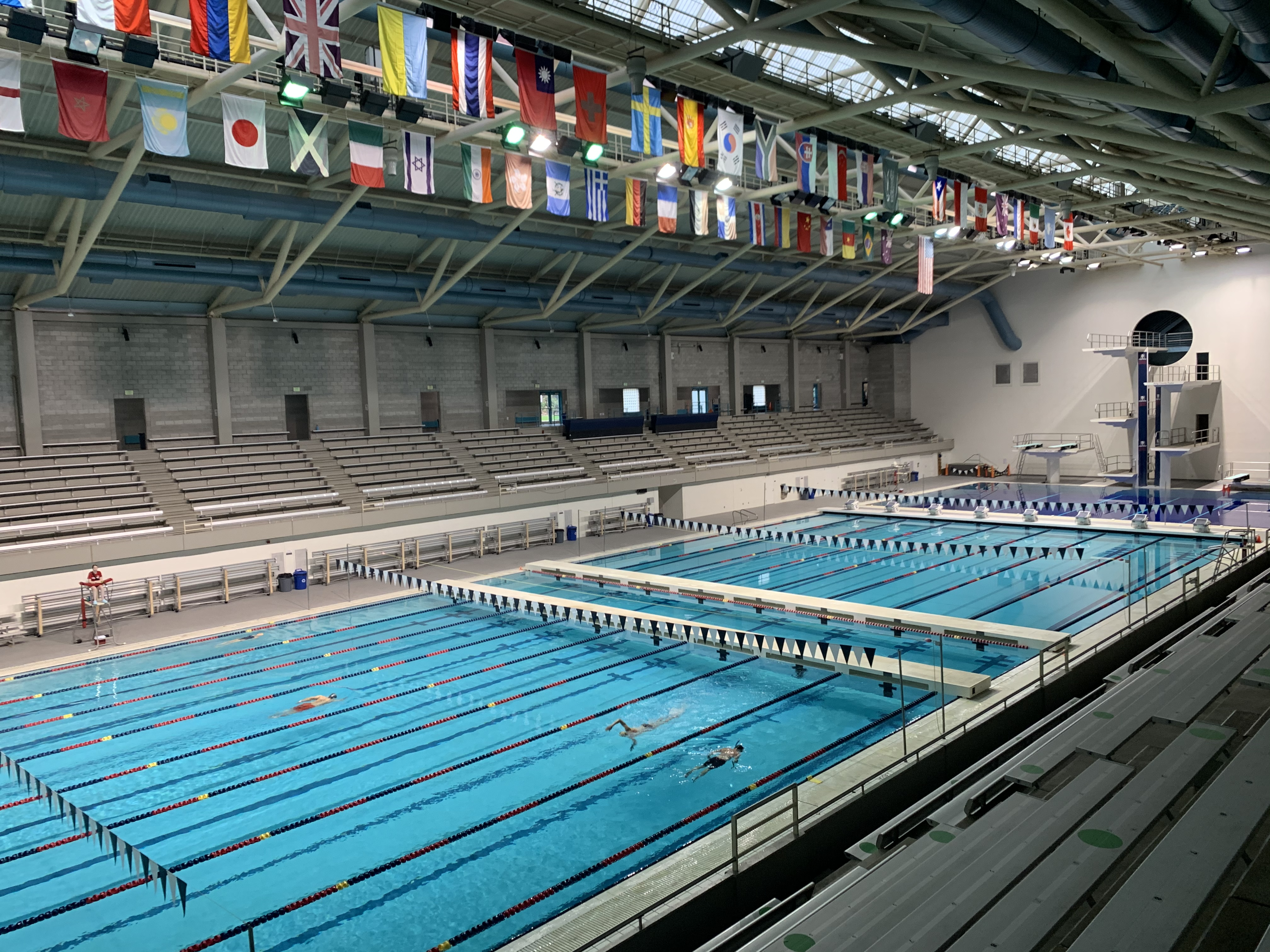
- Competition natatorium in November 2022
- Interactive map of Weyerhaeuser King County Aquatic Center
- Address: Federal Way, Washington, United States
- Capacity: 2,500

Construction
- Built: 1990
- Opened: April 18, 1990
- Cost: $18.8 million USD

The Weyerhaeuser King County Aquatic Center is an aquatic facility in Federal Way, Washington constructed for the 1990 Goodwill Games.

It has hosted US Olympic Diving Team Trials in 2000 and 2012, NCAA championships, PAC-12 conference championships, USA Swimming Winter National championships and Speedo Junior National championships. Over 200 world records have been set at the center.

The center is open to the public for open swim, pool exercise, family swim, lessons and lap swim.

== History ==
On April 18, 1990 the facility opened for general use. It was constructed to host the 1990 Goodwill Games, which were held in Seattle.

Land for the center's development was donated by the Weyerhauser corporation and the facility was named after the company and its Chairman, George Weyerhaeuser. The Seattle Goodwill Games Committee provided $5 million and King County issued an $8.8 million bond to fund the facility.

== Operations ==
=== Facilities ===
Swimming, synchronized swimming, diving and water polo are accommodated by the technical features of the center. It is one of only a few of its kind in the United States.

Center facilities include:

- 9–10.5 feet deep Olympic-sized competition and training pool (competition natatorium)
- 25 x 17 yard, 17 feet deep diving well equipped for platform and springboard diving (competition natatorium)
- 25 x 15 yard recreational pool with pirate cove features and theme (recreation pool)
- Banquet hall seating for 245 people banquet-style and 400 people theater-style (banquet hall)

For the COVID-19 pandemic, the center started serving as a COVID-19 testing site open to the public in October 2020.

The center has an annual economic impact of $7.5 million USD.

=== Closures ===
During the COVID-19 pandemic the center temporarily closed for several months, from March to September 2020, to accommodate best practices and prevent the spread of COVID-19. In November 2021, non-essential personnel and spectators were officially allowed back in to attend sporting events.

From August 1 to mid-September 2022 and for the summer of 2023, the center is temporarily closed to use by the public for facility upgrades following its turning 30 years of age.

== Events held at the center ==
As well as the Goodwill Games for which the center was constructed, each year the facility hosts high profile events. These have included Olympic Team Trials in diving, NCAA championships, PAC-12 conference championships, USA Swimming senior events and Speedo Junior Nationals. One way the center serves the community that funded its construction, the residents of King County, as well as Washington state residents at large, is through hosting events such as high school state swimming and diving championships.

== Recognition ==
In December 2015 Swimming World published a feature on King County Aquatic Center, highlighting eleven reasons it found the center to be "awesome," including playing a pivotal role in the swimming careers of notable Olympians Nathan Adrian (the only swimmer to make the list from Washington State), Michael Phelps, Missy Franklin, Cullen Jones, Simone Manuel, and Haley Anderson.

== Gallery ==
Some of the venue facilities include the following.

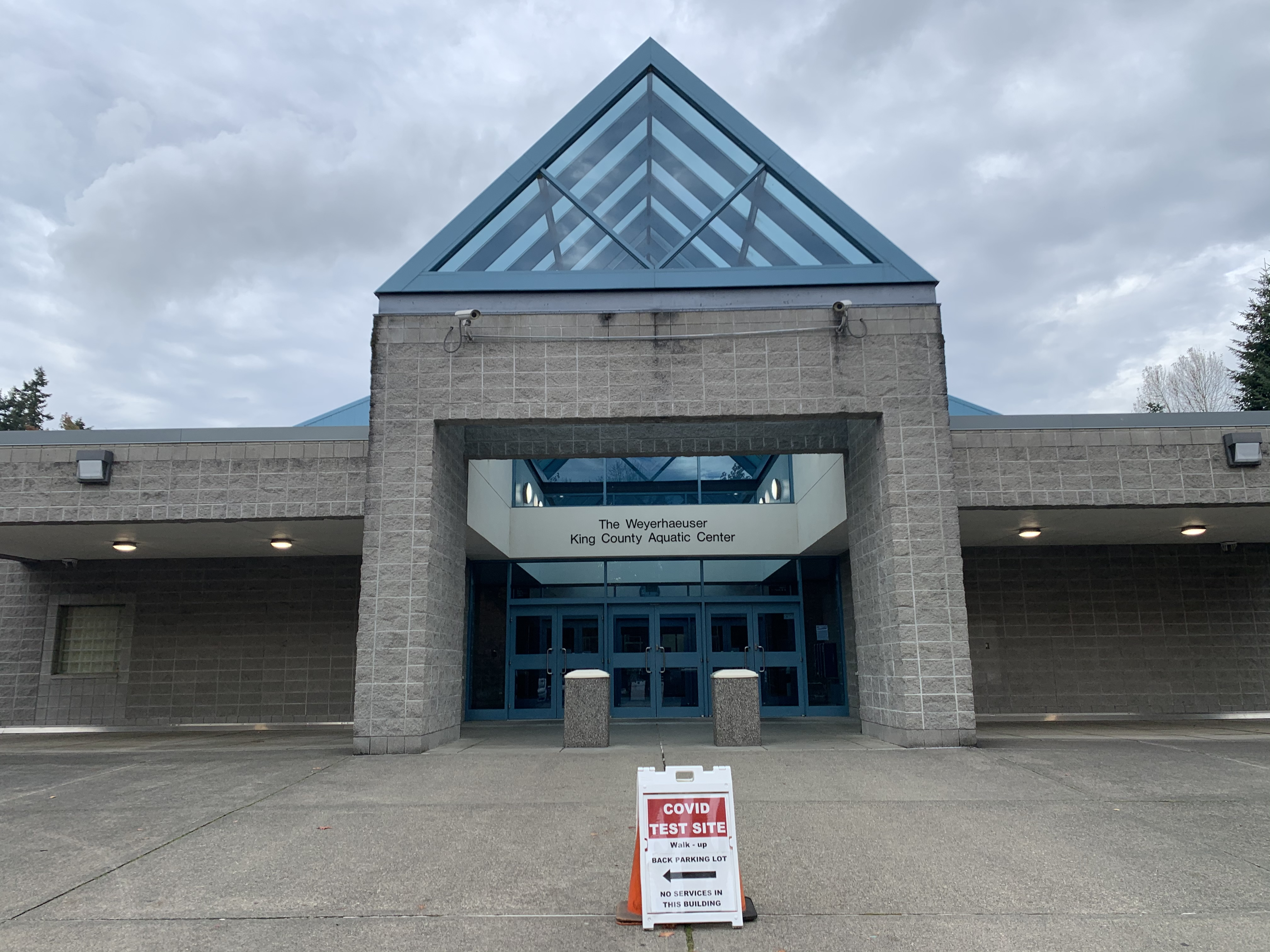
Main entrance and COVID-19 test site signage

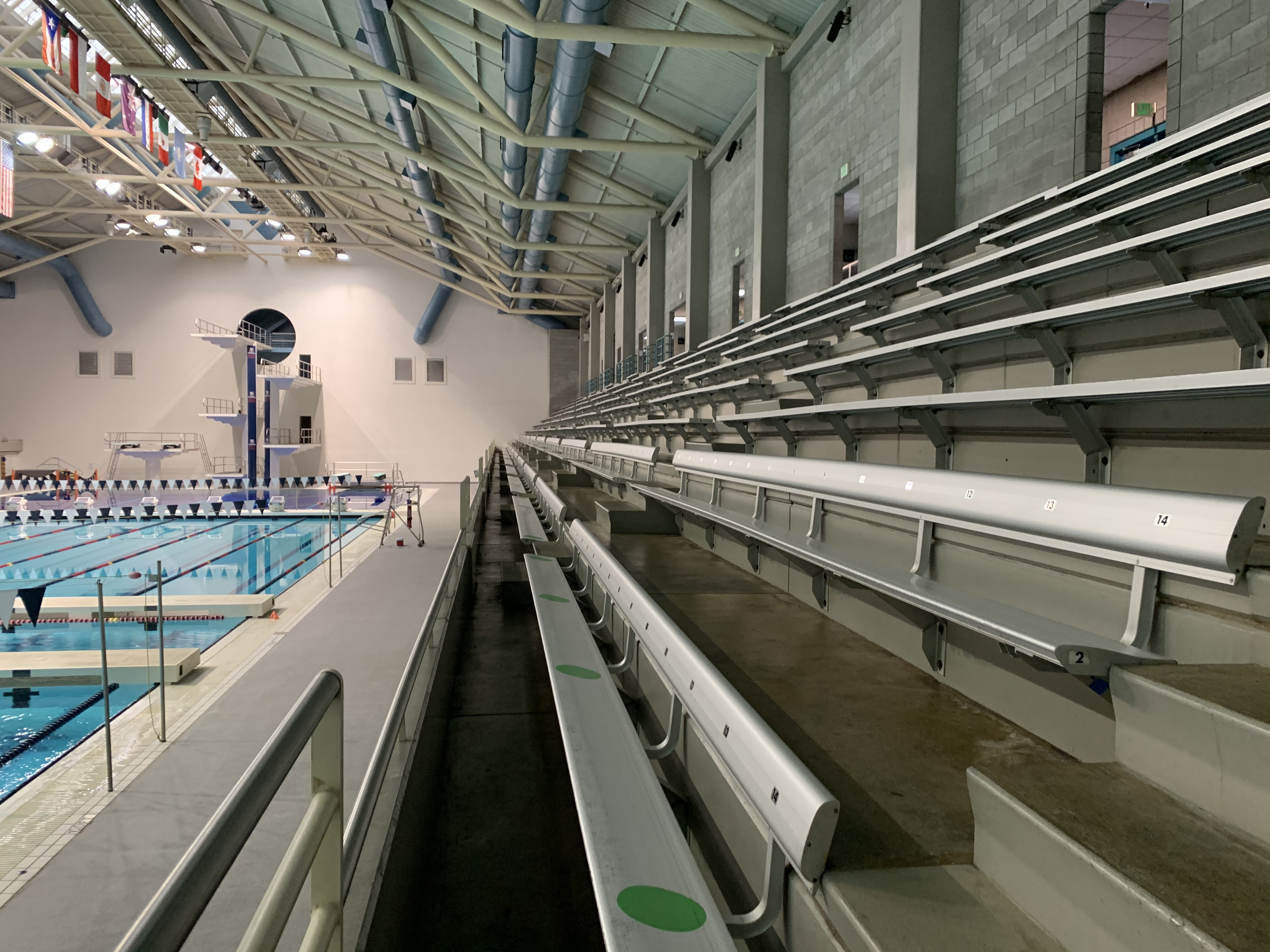
Bleacher seating in the competition natatorium

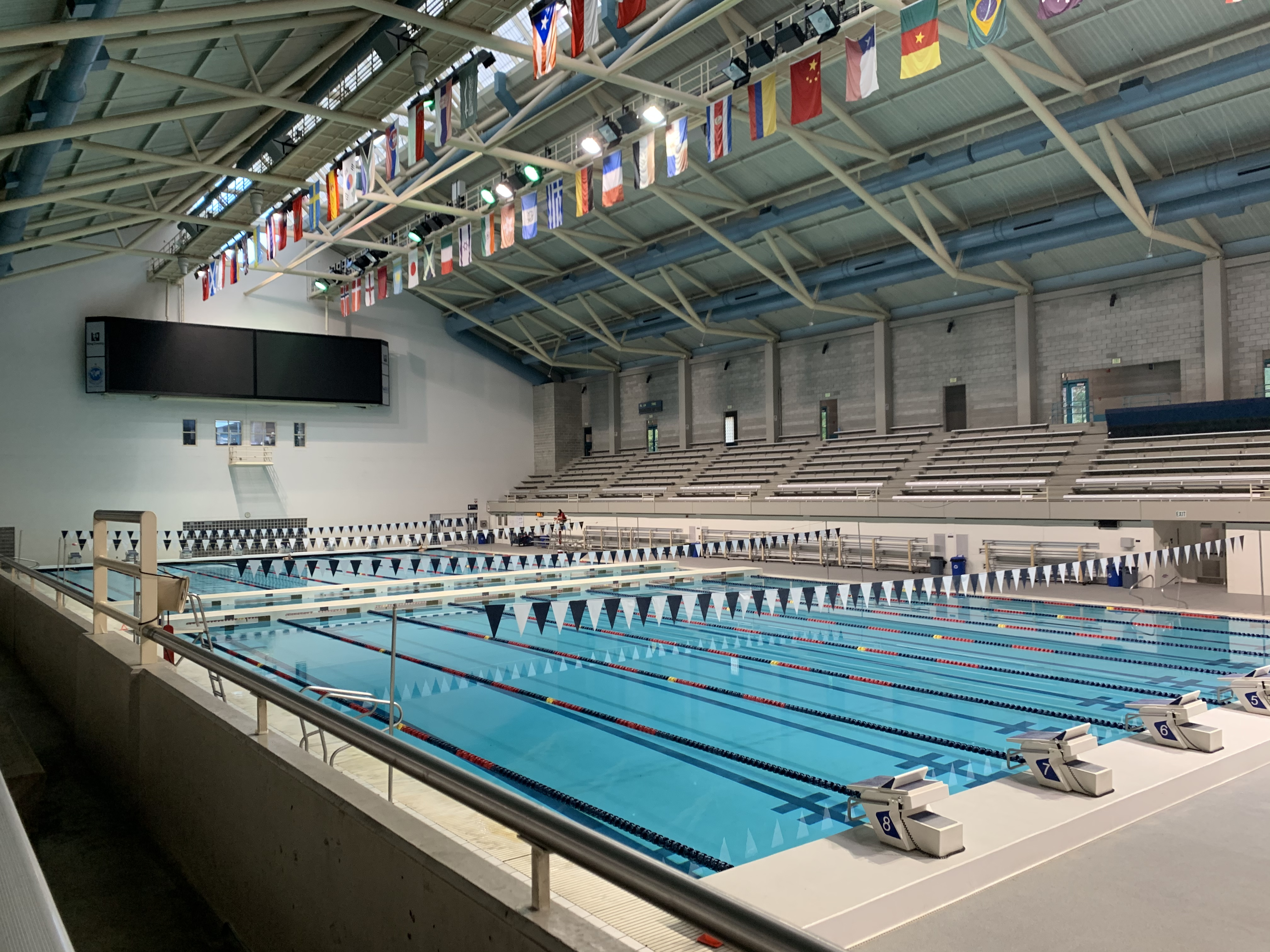
Competition pool with timing system

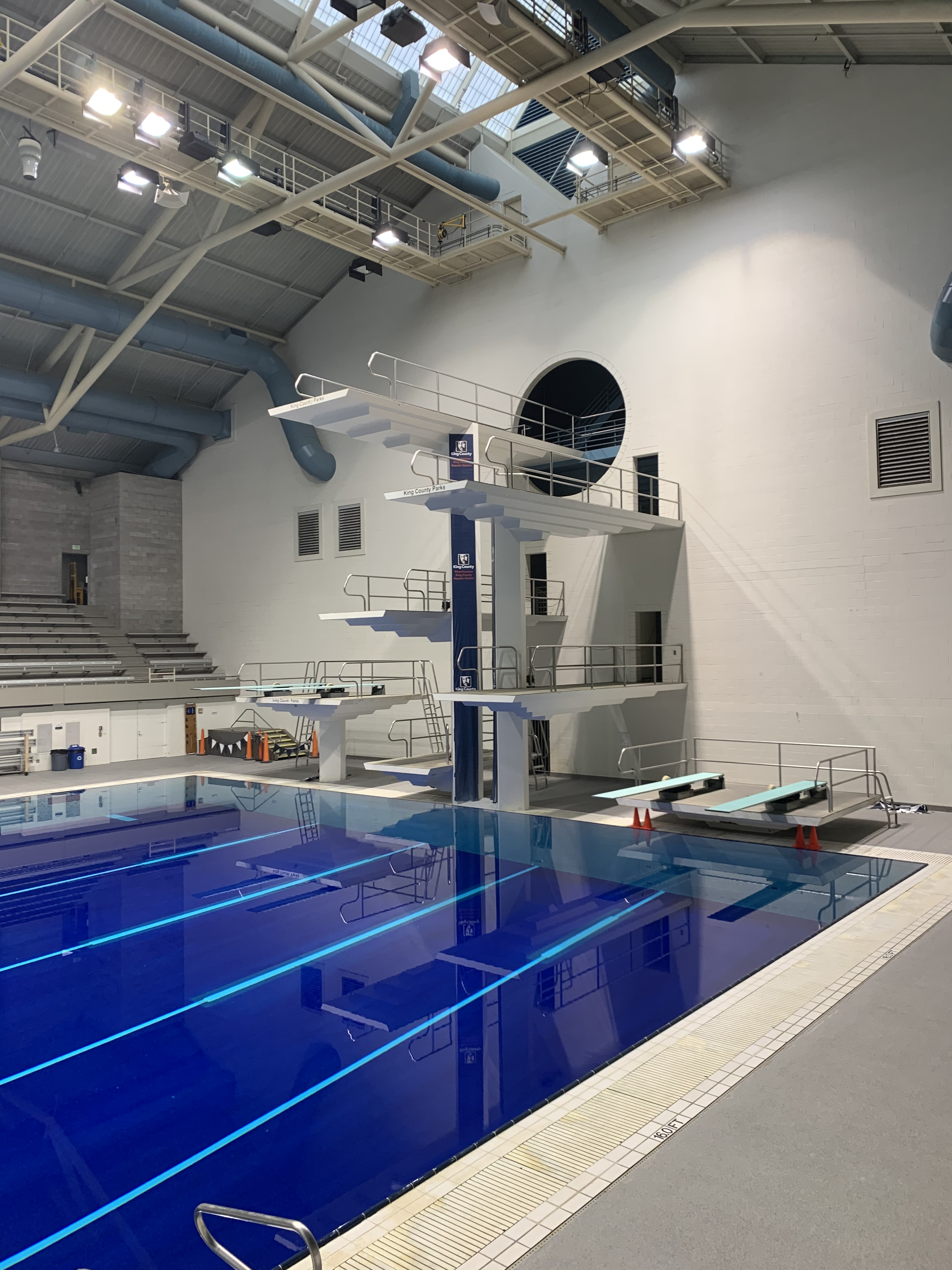
Diving well and tower

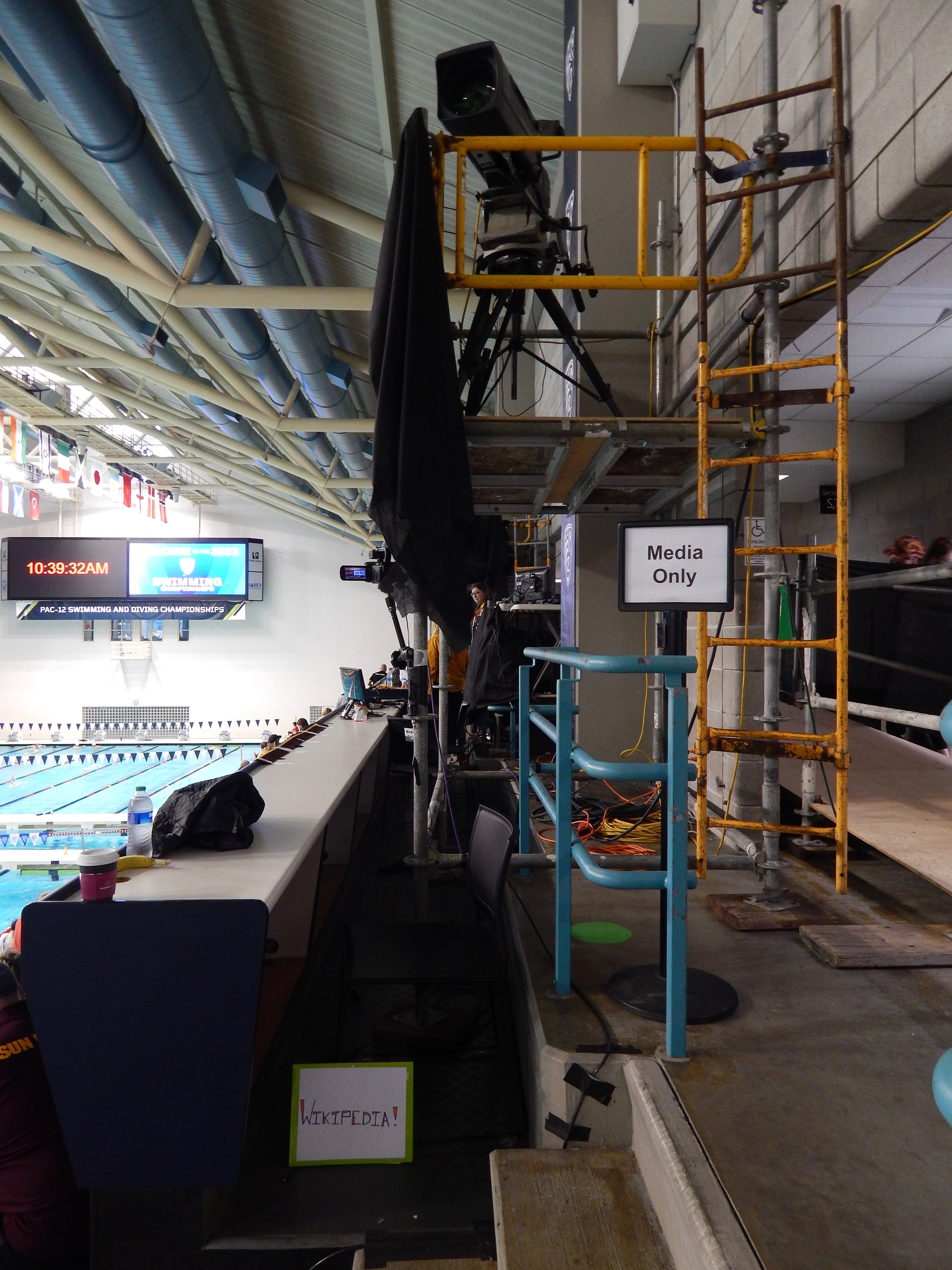
Media booth

== See also ==
- Swimming at the Goodwill Games
