= Diving at the 2022 Asian Games – Women's 1 metre springboard =

Diving competition

Women's 1 metre springboard at the 2022 Asian Games
- Venue: Hangzhou Olympic Expo Aquatics Center
- Date: 2 October 2023
- Competitors: 13 from 8 nations

Medalists
gold medal	Li Yajie	China
silver medal	Lin Shan	China
bronze medal	Kim Su-ji	South Korea

The women's 1 metre springboard competition at the 2022 Asian Games took place on 2 October 2023 at Hangzhou Olympic Expo Center.

== Schedule ==
All times are China Standard Time (UTC+08:00)

Date	Time	Event
Monday, 2 October 2023	16:00	Final

== Results ==
Legend

- DNS — Did not start

Rank	Athlete	Dive					Total
Rank	Athlete	1	2	3	4	5	Total
1st place, gold medalist(s)	Li Yajie (CHN)	58.80	66.30	58.65	67.50	66.30	317.55
2nd place, silver medalist(s)	Lin Shan (CHN)	60.00	70.20	55.20	61.20	57.20	303.80
3rd place, bronze medalist(s)	Kim Su-ji (KOR)	54.00	55.90	48.30	50.40	58.50	267.10
4	Nur Dhabitah Sabri (MAS)	56.40	59.80	47.15	46.50	52.00	261.85
5	Haruka Enomoto (JPN)	45.60	54.60	48.40	50.40	48.30	247.30
6	Chan Tsz Ming (HKG)	50.40	45.50	43.70	42.00	40.70	222.30
7	Ong Ker Ying (MAS)	48.00	39.00	42.55	44.40	45.50	219.45
8	Kim Na-hyun (KOR)	44.40	31.20	48.30	46.80	45.50	216.20
9	Ashlee Tan (SGP)	48.00	41.40	37.40	38.40	48.10	213.30
10	Lilli Prateep (THA)	48.00	24.70	48.30	40.80	42.50	204.30
11	Chan Lam (HKG)	46.80	44.20	33.35	33.60	33.00	190.95
12	Gladies Lariesa Garina (INA)	48.00	41.60	31.90	18.00	42.55	182.05
—	Fong Kay Yian (SGP)						DNS
