= Diving at the 2026 Asian Games – Women's 1 metre springboard =

Diving competition

Women's 1 metre springboard at the 2026 Asian Games
- Venue: Tokyo Aquatics Centre
- Date: 28 September 2026
- Competitors: 9 from 6 nations

Medalists
gold medal	Lin Shan	China
silver medal	Long Yiping	China
bronze medal	Kim Su-ji	South Korea

The women's 1 metre springboard competition at the 2026 Asian Games took place on 28 September 2026 at Tokyo Aquatics Centre.

== Schedule ==
All times are Japan Standard Time (UTC+09:00)

Date	Time	Event
Monday, 28 September 2026	10:00	Final

== Results ==
Rank	Athlete	Dive					Total
Rank	Athlete	1	2	3	4	5	Total
1st place, gold medalist(s)	Lin Shan (CHN)	51.60	54.60	49.45	52.80	54.60	263.05
2nd place, silver medalist(s)	Long Yiping (CHN)	49.45	65.10	49.50	33.00	57.20	254.25
3rd place, bronze medalist(s)	Kim Su-ji (KOR)	39.60	53.30	47.15	50.40	54.60	245.05
4	Chan Tsz Ming (HKG)	48.00	45.50	47.15	49.20	42.90	232.75
5	Kim Na-hyun (KOR)	48.00	42.90	51.60	46.80	39.10	228.40
6	Ong Ker Ying (MAS)	48.00	41.60	37.95	38.40	42.90	208.85
7	Leung Ka Sin (HKG)	40.80	39.60	44.85	32.40	33.00	190.65
8	Jacqueline Chen (TPE)	39.60	31.05	34.80	37.20	33.00	175.65
9	Zhao Hang U (MAC)	37.20	31.20	28.75	38.40	25.00	160.55
