= Greg Duncan (diver) =

American diver (born 1998)

Personal information
- Full name: Gregory Bruce Duncan
- Born: December 14, 1998 (age 27) Roanoke, Virginia, U.S.
- Home town: Oakton, Virginia, U.S.

Sport
- League: Northern Virginia Swim League
Medal record
Men's diving
Representing United States
World Cup
| Silver medal – second place | 2022 Berlin | 3 m synchro |

Gregory Bruce Duncan (born December 14, 1998) is an American athlete who competes in diving.

== Background ==
Duncan comes from Oakton, Virginia and trained at Purdue University in Indiana. In 2018, he transferred from the University of North Carolina to Arizona.

== Career ==
In 2019, he represented USA Diving at the World University Games in Naples, Italy. He qualified to compete at the 2024 Summer Olympics.

== International awards ==
FINA Diving World Cup
| Year | Place | Medal | Event | Other |
|---|---|---|---|---|
| 2022 | Berlin (Germany) | Silver | Synchronized 3m Springboard | Won with Tyler Downs |
