= Diving at the 2022 Asian Games – Women's 3 metre springboard =

Diving competition

Women's 3 metre springboard at the 2022 Asian Games
- Venue: Hangzhou Olympic Expo Aquatics Center
- Date: 4 October 2023
- Competitors: 10 from 6 nations

Medalists
gold medal	Chen Yiwen	China
silver medal	Chang Yani	China
bronze medal	Sayaka Mikami	Japan

The women's 3 metre springboard competition at the 2022 Asian Games took place on 4 October 2023 at Hangzhou Olympic Expo Center.

== Schedule ==
All times are China Standard Time (UTC+08:00)

Date	Time	Event
Wednesday, 4 October 2023	10:00	Preliminary
Wednesday, 4 October 2023	17:30	Final

== Results ==
Legend

- DNS — Did not start

=== Preliminary ===
Rank	Athlete	Dive					Total
Rank	Athlete	1	2	3	4	5	Total
1	Chen Yiwen (CHN)	72.00	76.50	73.50	77.50	76.50	376.00
2	Chang Yani (CHN)	70.50	69.00	48.00	66.65	66.00	320.15
3	Kim Su-ji (KOR)	58.50	60.45	56.00	67.50	60.00	302.45
4	Sayaka Mikami (JPN)	54.00	63.55	55.50	60.00	68.00	301.05
5	Haruka Enomoto (JPN)	58.50	48.05	51.00	66.00	54.00	277.55
6	Kimberly Bong (MAS)	43.20	52.80	42.00	53.20	48.00	239.20
7	Gladies Lariesa Garina (INA)	40.50	37.20	54.00	40.50	51.00	223.20
8	Park Ha-reum (KOR)	43.20	51.80	50.40	29.70	44.40	219.50
9	Lilli Prateep (THA)	25.65	32.20	40.50	24.00	40.50	162.85
—	Nur Dhabitah Sabri (MAS)						DNS

=== Final ===
Rank	Athlete	Dive					Total
Rank	Athlete	1	2	3	4	5	Total
1st place, gold medalist(s)	Chen Yiwen (CHN)	76.50	79.50	67.50	77.50	81.00	382.00
2nd place, silver medalist(s)	Chang Yani (CHN)	69.00	67.50	70.50	69.75	73.50	350.25
3rd place, bronze medalist(s)	Sayaka Mikami (JPN)	57.00	69.75	40.50	66.00	71.40	304.65
4	Kim Su-ji (KOR)	58.50	60.45	57.40	54.00	58.50	288.85
5	Haruka Enomoto (JPN)	55.50	57.35	57.00	51.00	49.50	270.35
6	Kimberly Bong (MAS)	48.60	51.60	37.80	58.80	50.40	247.20
7	Park Ha-reum (KOR)	45.60	54.60	54.60	45.90	43.20	243.90
8	Gladies Lariesa Garina (INA)	46.50	65.10	49.50	31.50	42.00	234.60
9	Lilli Prateep (THA)	44.55	28.00	37.50	48.00	40.50	198.55
