= Diving at the 2018 Asian Games – Women's synchronized 3 metre springboard =

Women's synchronized 3 metre springboard at the 2018 Asian Games
- Venue: Gelora Bung Karno Aquatic Stadium
- Date: 29 August 2018
- Competitors: 18 from 9 nations

Medalists
gold medal	Chang Yani; Shi Tingmao	China
silver medal	Ng Yan Yee; Nur Dhabitah Sabri	Malaysia
bronze medal	Kim Kwang-hui; Kim Mi-hwa	North Korea

The women's synchronized 3 metre springboard competition at the 2018 Asian Games took place on 29 August 2018 at the Gelora Bung Karno Aquatic Stadium.

== Schedule ==
All times are Western Indonesia Time (UTC+07:00)

Date	Time	Event
Wednesday, 29 August 2018	18:45	Final

== Results ==
Rank	Team	Dive					Total
Rank	Team	1	2	3	4	5	Total
1st place, gold medalist(s)	China (CHN); Chang Yani; Shi Tingmao	52.20	55.80	76.50	73.80	77.40	335.70
2nd place, silver medalist(s)	Malaysia (MAS); Ng Yan Yee; Nur Dhabitah Sabri	48.00	47.40	69.30	66.03	67.50	298.23
3rd place, bronze medalist(s)	North Korea (PRK); Kim Kwang-hui; Kim Mi-hwa	46.80	45.60	66.60	56.28	67.50	282.78
4	South Korea (KOR); Kim Su-ji; Kim Na-mi	46.80	44.40	60.48	62.16	54.90	268.74
5	Japan (JPN); Sayaka Mikami; Hazuki Miyamoto	42.60	31.80	53.10	60.30	62.10	249.90
6	Singapore (SGP); Fong Kay Yian; Ashlee Tan	42.00	38.40	51.12	57.12	56.70	245.34
7	Indonesia (INA); Eka Purnama Indah; Maria Natalie Dinda Anasti	39.60	42.00	46.98	49.68	52.20	230.46
8	Macau (MAC); Choi Sut Kuan; Leong Sut Chan	38.40	36.60	34.02	41.04	48.24	198.30
9	Hong Kong (HKG); Lee Yin Ting; Liu Yuen Ki	37.80	35.40	37.17	42.48	34.02	186.87
