= Chen Yiwen =

Chinese diver (born 1999)

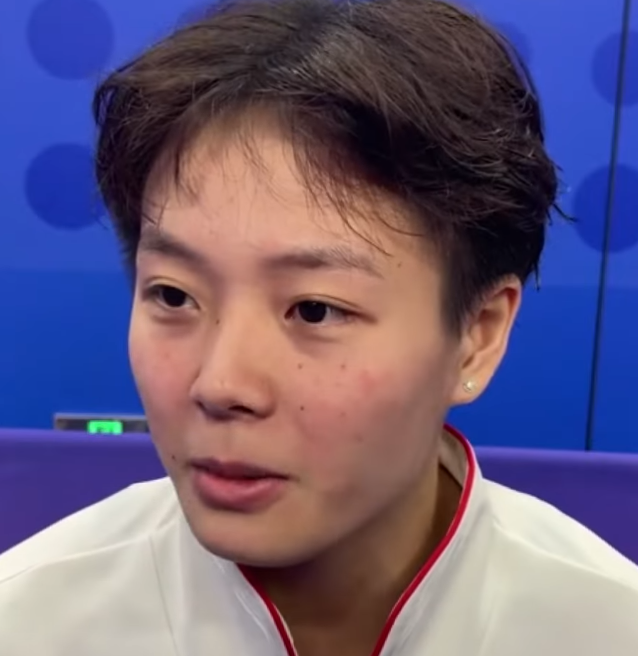
- Chen in 2023

Personal information
- Nationality: Chinese
- Born: 15 June 1999 (age 27) Haikou, Hainan, China
- Height: 1.65 m (5 ft 5 in)

Sport
- Country: China
- Sport: Diving
- Events: 1 m springboard, 3 m springboard, 3 m synchro
Medal record
Women's diving
Representing China
Olympic Games
Gold medal – first place	2024 Paris	3 m synchro
Gold medal – first place	2024 Paris	3 m springboard
World Championships
Gold medal – first place	2019 Gwangju	1 m springboard
Gold medal – first place	2022 Budapest	3 m springboard
Gold medal – first place	2022 Budapest	3 m synchro
Gold medal – first place	2023 Fukuoka	3 m springboard
Gold medal – first place	2023 Fukuoka	3 m synchro
Gold medal – first place	2024 Doha	3 m synchro
Gold medal – first place	2025 Singapore	3 m springboard
Gold medal – first place	2025 Singapore	Team
Gold medal – first place	2025 Singapore	3 m synchro
Silver medal – second place	2024 Doha	3 m springboard
Asian Games
Gold medal – first place	2022 Hangzhou	3 m springboard
Gold medal – first place	2022 Hangzhou	3 m synchro
Gold medal – first place	2026 Aichi–Nagoya	3 m springboard
Gold medal – first place	2026 Aichi–Nagoya	3 m synchro
Silver medal – second place	2018 Jakarta-Palembang	1 m springboard

Chen Yiwen (simplified Chinese: 陈艺文; traditional Chinese: 陳藝文; pinyin: Chén Yìwén; Jyutping: Can4 Ngai6 Man4; born 15 June 1999) is a Chinese diver.

== Early life ==
Born in 1999, Chen's father was from Hainan, while her mother was from Zhanjiang, Guangdong. When she was almost nine years old, she went to Guangdong for training and entered sports school in the Chikan District of Zhanjiang to begin training for her diving career. In August 2008, she officially entered the Zhongshan diving team. Soon after entering the Zhongshan team, Chen was selected into the Guangdong Provincial Sports School. In October 2010, Chen entered the Guangdong diving team and in 2014, she officially became a professional athlete.

== Sports career ==
In November 2016, Chen was selected into the national diving team. On 17 May 2017, she won the women's 1m springboard diving at the 2017 China Diving Championship. In June 2018, she won the men's and women's mixed all-around diving at the 2018 FINA Diving World Cup in Wuhan. At the 2018 Asian Games in Jakarta, Chen won the silver medal in 1m springboard.On 13 July 2019, she won the gold medal at the women's 1m springboard championship at 2019 World Aquatics Championships in Gwangju. In May 2021, at the 2021 FINA Diving World Cup in Tokyo, she and Chang Yani won the women's double 3m diving, and she also won women's 3m springboard diving. In August 2021, Chen won gold medal in women's 3m springboard diving at the 14th National Games of China in Shaanxi.

At the 19th FINA World Championships 2022 held in Budapest, Chen took part in the women's 3m springboard and won the gold medal with 366.90 points. She also won the gold medal at the women's synchronized 3m springboard alongside Chang Yani with 343.14 points.

In 2023, at the 2022 Asian Games in Hangzhou, Chen won gold in the 3 metre springboard and another gold with Chang in 3 metre synchro.

At the 2024 Summer Olympics in Paris, Chen and Chang won their first Olympic gold medals in the women's synchronized 3m springboard on 28 July 2024. Chen then won a gold medal in women's 3m springboard on 9 August 2024.
