= United States Olympic trials (diving) =

The United States Olympic team trials in diving are held before every Summer Olympics to select the participators for the USA's diving team. The event is overseen by the United States Olympic Committee and run by USA Diving.

== Venues ==
- 1984 - Indianapolis, Indiana
- 1988 - Indianapolis, Indiana
- 1992 - Indianapolis, Indiana
- 1996 - Indianapolis, Indiana
- 2000 - Weyerhaeuser King County Aquatic Center - Federal Way, Washington
- 2004 - St. Peters, Missouri
- 2008 - Indianapolis, Indiana
- 2012 - Weyerhaeuser King County Aquatic Center - Federal Way, Washington, June 17-24, 2012
- 2016 - Indianapolis, Indiana, June 2016
- 2020 - Indianapolis, Indiana, June 6–13, 2021
- 2024 - Knoxville, Tennessee, June 17-23, 2024
