= Steele Johnson =

American diver (born 1996)

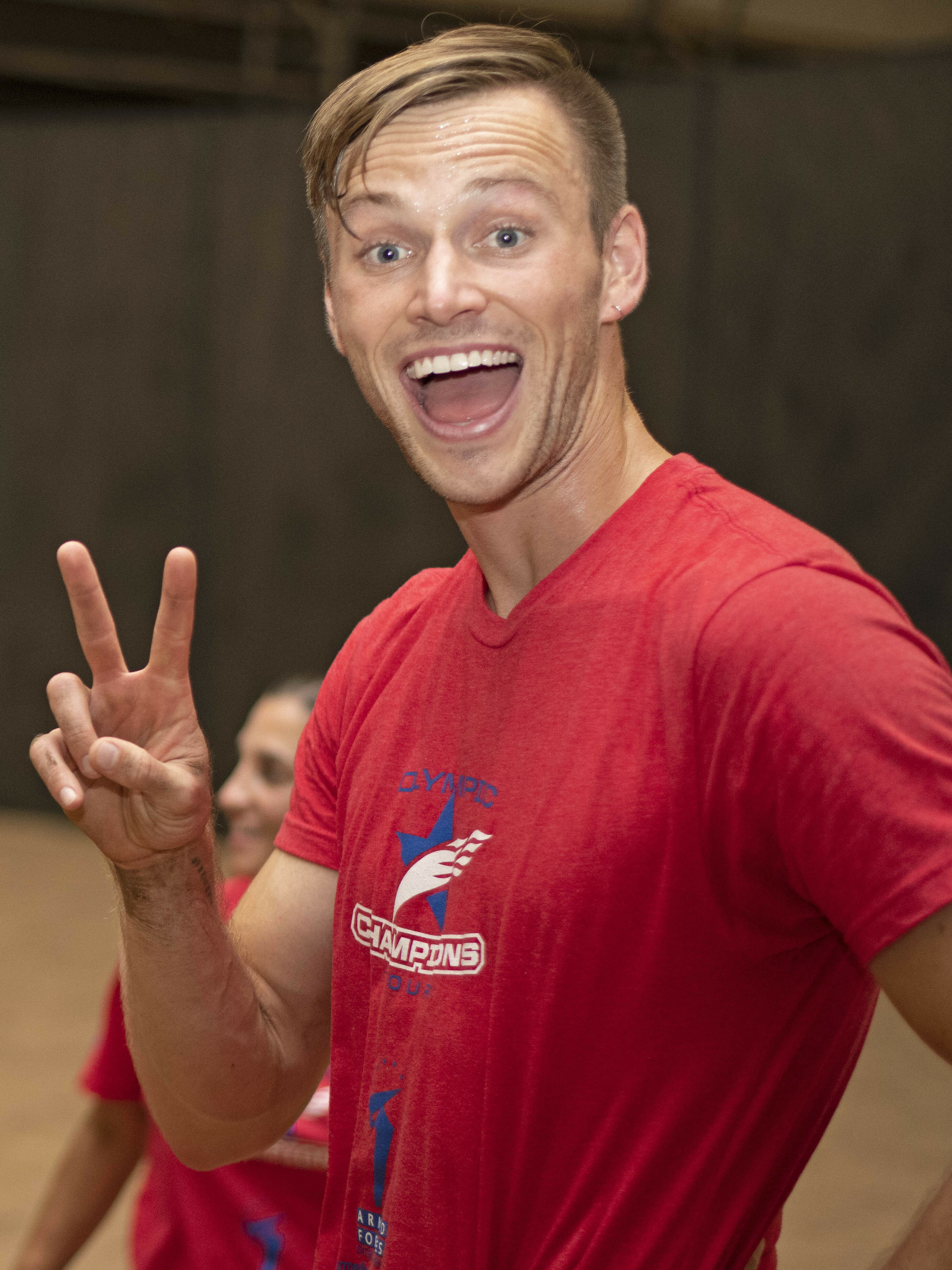
- Johnson in 2021

Personal information
- Full name: Steele Alexander Johnson
- National team: United States
- Born: June 16, 1996 (age 30) Indianapolis, Indiana, U.S.
- Height: 6 ft 0 in (183 cm)
- Spouse: Hilary Nussbaum

Sport
- Country: United States
- Events: 10m, 10m synchro
- College team: Purdue University
- Club: Boiler Diving Academy
- Coached by: Adam Soldati (Purdue)
Medal record
Men's diving
Representing the United States
Event	1st	2nd	3rd
Olympic Games	0	1	0
FINA Diving World Cup	0	0	1
Total	0	1	1
Olympic Games
Silver medal – second place	2016 Rio de Janeiro	10 m synchro
FINA Diving World Cup
Bronze medal – third place	2014 Shanghai	10 m synchro

Steele Alexander Johnson (born June 16, 1996) is an American former diver. He won the 10-meter platform at the 2013 USA Diving Winter Nationals, is a 15-time junior national champion, and is a four-time champion at the Junior Pan American Games. Johnson made his Olympic debut at the 2016 Rio Games, where he won a silver medal with David Boudia in the men's 10 m synchronized platform diving competition. Johnson is also a six-time senior national champion with USA Diving.

== Early life and education ==
Johnson was born in Indianapolis, Indiana, to Bill and Jill Johnson. He has an older brother named Race and a younger sister named Hollyn. He earned his high school diploma from Laurel Springs School, an accredited private online school based in Ojai, California.

== Early diving experience ==
Johnson began diving at age seven.

Johnson suffered a potentially fatal head injury on January 21, 2009, at the age of 12. While attempting a reverse 3 1/2 somersault in tuck position, he struck his head on the concrete platform. After falling 33 feet into the water below, Johnson was motionless until being rescued by his coach, John Wingfield. According to Johnson, Wingfield helped to limit his blood loss. Johnson has stated that he was hospitalized, that his scalp wound was stapled shut, and that he was diagnosed with only a minor concussion. Johnson resumed diving a month following the accident. In 2016, Johnson revealed that he still suffered from short- and long-term memory loss due to the accident.

In the summer of 2014, with his future Olympic diving teammate, David Boudia, Johnson represented USA Diving at the FINA Diving World Cup. Johnson and Boudia won a bronze medal in the synchronized 10-meter platform.

== College diving career ==
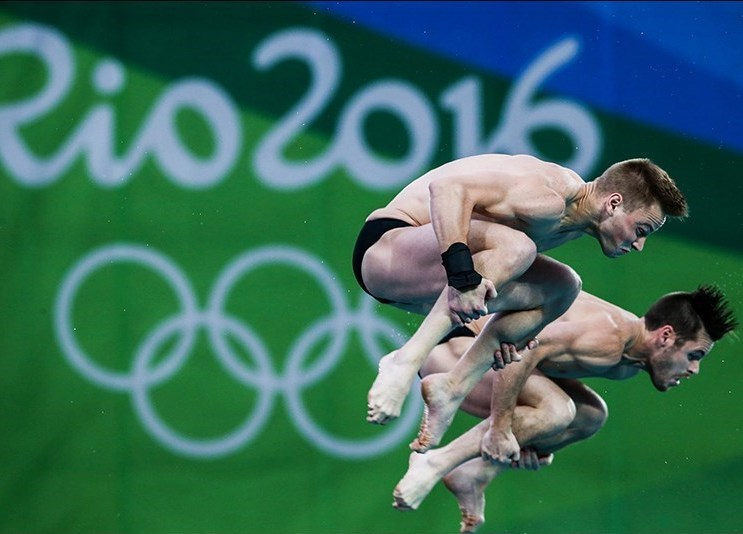
Steele Johnson and David Boudia at the Rio Olympics

Johnson attended college at Purdue University, where he trained and competed under Head Coach Adam Soldati. In 2015, Johnson became the first diver since Purdue alumnus David Boudia in 2009 to win NCAA titles on springboard and platform in the same year. Johnson also won CSCAA Diver of the year, Big Ten Diver of the Year, Purdue Male Athlete of the Year, Two-time All American (1-meter and platform diving), and Honorable Mention All-American (3-meter Diving); he was also a World Championships Qualifier (Synchronized 10-meter). Johnson was selected as the Big 10 Diver of the Week eight times during the 2014–2015 season and was named Diver of the Year for 2015.

Johnson redshirted the 2015-2016 diving season to train for the 2016 Summer Olympics in Rio de Janeiro.

In December 2016, Johnson received a silver medal on the one-meter springboard at the USA Diving Winter National Championships and qualified for the 2017 World Aquatics Championships in Budapest, Hungary. During the 2016 season, Johnson won bronze on three-meter and finished in the top four of all three diving events at the Big 10 Diving Championships. Steele scored a 470.05 points on one-meter, surpassing Boudia's previous record of 468.55 set in 2010. Additionally, Johnson won his first Big Ten Conference title for platform diving with a score of 547.8. Johnson was also named First Team All-Big Ten.

In March 2018, Johnson won his fifth NCAA championship, scoring 499.35 points to win his second championship in a row on the three-meter board.

Johnson underwent surgeries in September 2018 and February 2019 to remedy stress fractures in his right foot and subsequent complications. The foot injury and ensuing surgeries caused him to miss the entire 2018-2019 college diving season. Johnson opted out of his final year of college diving eligibility to turn professional.

== Olympic diving career ==
At the June 2016 Olympic trials, Johnson and partner David Boudia achieved a score of 491.01 in men's synchronized 10-meter platform diving; this total was the highest ever for an American team. Johnson and Boudia went on to win a silver medal in that event at the 2016 Summer Olympics in Rio de Janeiro, Brazil. At the Olympics, the pair were in second place following each of the six rounds of the competition. The team of Chen Aisen and Lin Yue of China won the gold, while the bronze went to Britain's Tom Daley and Daniel Goodfellow. Johnson and Boudia scored a 457.11. In the 10-meter platform individual event, Johnson placed 13th with a score of 447.85. After the 2016 Olympics, Johnson revealed that he had competed on a broken foot at the Olympic Games.

In June 2021, Johnson withdrew from the 2020 Olympic trials due to a right foot injury. (The 2020 Olympic Games were postponed to 2021 due to the COVID-19 pandemic.) Johnson had been competing on the springboard as an individual and in synchronized diving. In announcing his decision, Johnson said, "'I’ve endured 2 failed surgeries, years on and off of crutches and have pushed as hard as I physically can... My foot has not been healthy for 6 years now, but over the past few months my pain has been increasing to a level that is not sustainable to push through anymore'".

== Professional diving career ==
In 2019, Johnson started diving with Ben Bramley on the platform synchro (Johnson's Olympic diving partner, David Boudia, decided to switch to springboard diving). Johnson and Bramley finished eighth in the 10m synchro at the 2019 World Championships held in Gwangju, Korea.

On December 2, 2024, Johnson announced his retirement from the sport of diving.

== Other work ==
At the age of 15, Johnson began posting daily vlogs onto his YouTube channel, TheSteeleJohnson. Occasionally, during his live vlog, he has discussed his 2009 head injury. In one post, he said that the reverse 3 1/2 somersault in tuck position—the dive he was attempting when he was injured—is his favorite dive to practice: "Something which almost killed me has become the thing I'm best at."

Johnson made his acting debut in a student film entitled "Blood And Water".

Johnson appeared as himself on ABC's To Tell the Truth game show hosted by Anthony Anderson on June 4, 2020.

== Personal life ==
Johnson married Hilary Nussbaum in Colorado on June 23, 2017. He is a Christian. Johnson has stated that his Christian faith affected his perspective on his 2009 head injury:

"I wanted to be the kid that had the big injury and came back from it and made the Olympics and all that stuff. So it’s kind of embarrassing. But now I’ve kind of realized that God had his hand over all of it to help me come to the realization, like, that’s not why at all."

“He gave me this ability to dive. Yes, I had that accident. I had that injury. It happens. But I still had the ability to dive, and I still had the passion for diving. So now it's gone from a selfish desire to be like some cool story to a selfless desire, like, God kept me alive and He is still giving me the ability to do what I do."
