= Kim Su-ji (diver) =

South Korean diver (born 1998)

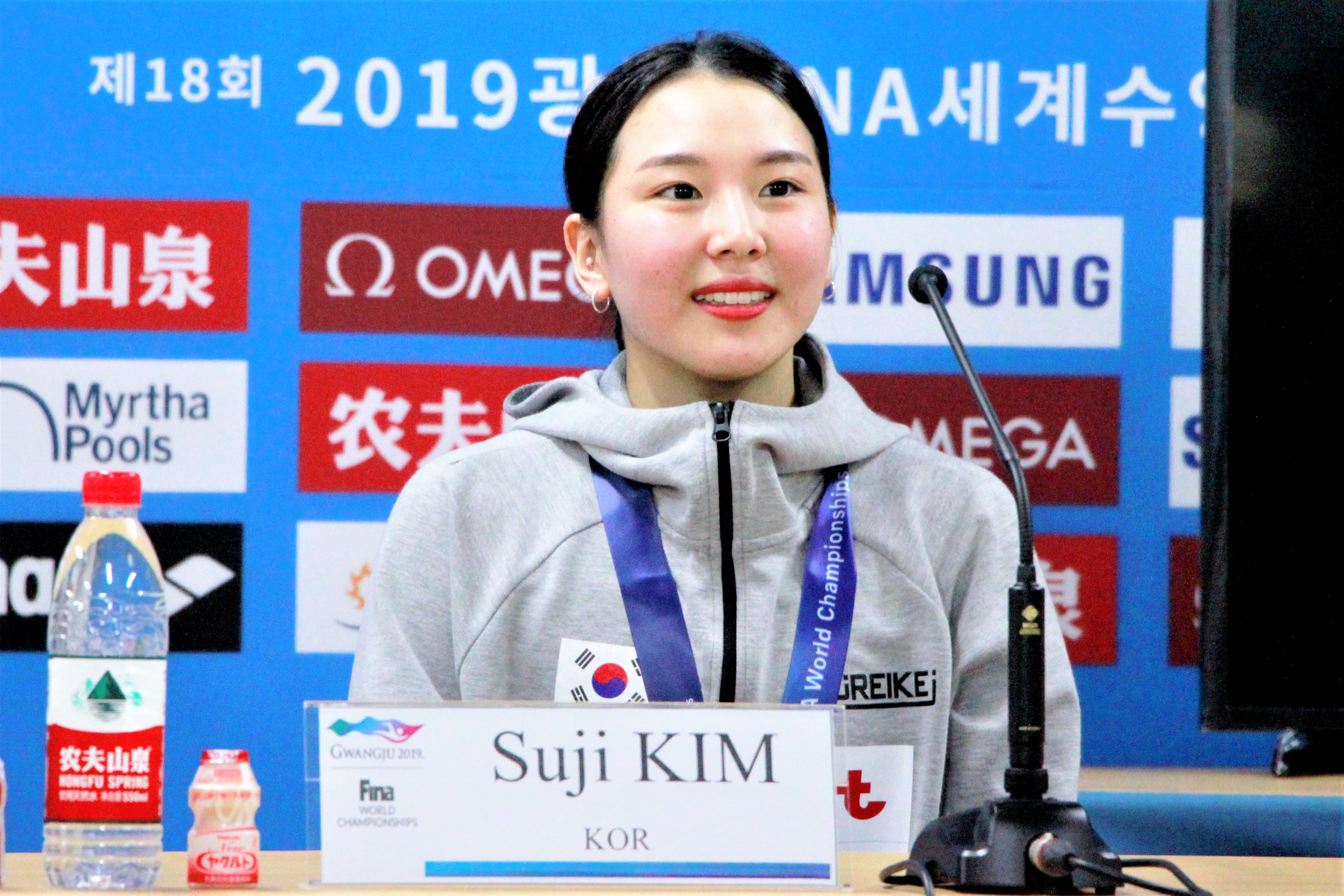

Personal information
- Nationality: South Korean
- Born: 16 February 1998 (age 28) Gyeongsangnam-do, South Korea
- Height: 1.52 m (5 ft 0 in)
- Weight: 44 kg (97 lb)

Korean name
- Hangul: 김수지
- RR: Gim Suji
- MR: Kim Suji

Sport
- Country: South Korea
- Sport: Diving
- Events: 1 m springboard, 3 m springboard, 3 m synchro
- Club: Ulsan Metropolitan City Hall
Medal record
Women's diving
Representing South Korea
World Championships
Bronze medal – third place	2019 Gwangju	1 m springboard
Bronze medal – third place	2024 Doha	3 m springboard
Bronze medal – third place	2024 Doha	3 m mixed synchro
Asian Games
Silver medal – second place	2026 Aichi–Nagoya	3 m synchro
Bronze medal – third place	2018 Jakarta	1 m springboard
Bronze medal – third place	2022 Hangzhou	3 m synchro
Bronze medal – third place	2022 Hangzhou	1 m springboard
Bronze medal – third place	2026 Aichi–Nagoya	1 m springboard
Summer Universiade
Silver medal – second place	2017 Taipei	3 m synchro
Bronze medal – third place	2017 Taipei	3 m springboard

Kim Su-ji (born 16 February 1998) is a South Korean diver. She competed in the 10-metre platform event at the 2012 Summer Olympics. The youngest member of the South Korean contingent at the Olympics that year, she lives in Ulsan, where she graduated from Guyeong Primary School and went on to Cheonsang Middle School. She won a bronze medal along with Cho Eun-bi in the women's 10-metre synchronised platform event at the 2013 East Asian Games in Tianjin.

She acquired 8th position in 2018 Asian Games Women's 3-metre springboard and won a bronze medal in 1 metre springboard.

== Diving achievements ==
Competition	Event	2012	2013	2014	2015	2016	2017	2018	2019	2020	2021	2022	2023	2024	2025
International representing South Korea
Olympic Games	10m Platform	26th													
Olympic Games	3m Springboard										15th			13th	
FINA World Aquatics Championships	3m Springboard		29th		34th				21st			16th	16th	3rd	
FINA World Aquatics Championships	10m Platform		32nd		24th		33rd								
FINA World Aquatics Championships	Synchronised 3m Springboard		18th		13th				12th				12th	10th	
FINA World Aquatics Championships	Synchronised 10m Platform		11th		12th		14th								
FINA World Aquatics Championships	1m Springboard				8th				3rd			18th	19th	8th	19th
FINA World Aquatics Championships	Mixed Synchronised 3m Springboard								15th			6th	4th	3rd	
FINA World Aquatics Championships	Mixed 3m & 10m Team												8th		
FINA Diving World Cup	3m Springboard	38th		27th		32nd					13th		5th		
FINA Diving World Cup	10m Platform	27th		27th											
FINA Diving World Cup	Synchronised 3m Springboard	14th		13th		13th					12th				
FINA Diving World Cup	Synchronised 10m Platform	11th		10th											
FINA Diving World Cup	Mixed 3m & 10m Team												7th		
Asian Games	1m Springboard			4th				3rd					3rd		
Asian Games	3m Springboard			6th				8th					4th		
Asian Games	Synchronised 3m Springboard			4th				4th					3rd		
Asian Games	Synchronised 10m Platform			5th											
Summer Universiade	1m Springboard						6th								
Summer Universiade	3m Springboard						3rd								
Summer Universiade	10m Platform						9th								
Summer Universiade	Synchronised 3m Springboard						2nd								
Summer Universiade	Mixed team						6th								
