= Elizabeth Roussel =

New Zealand diver (born 1997)

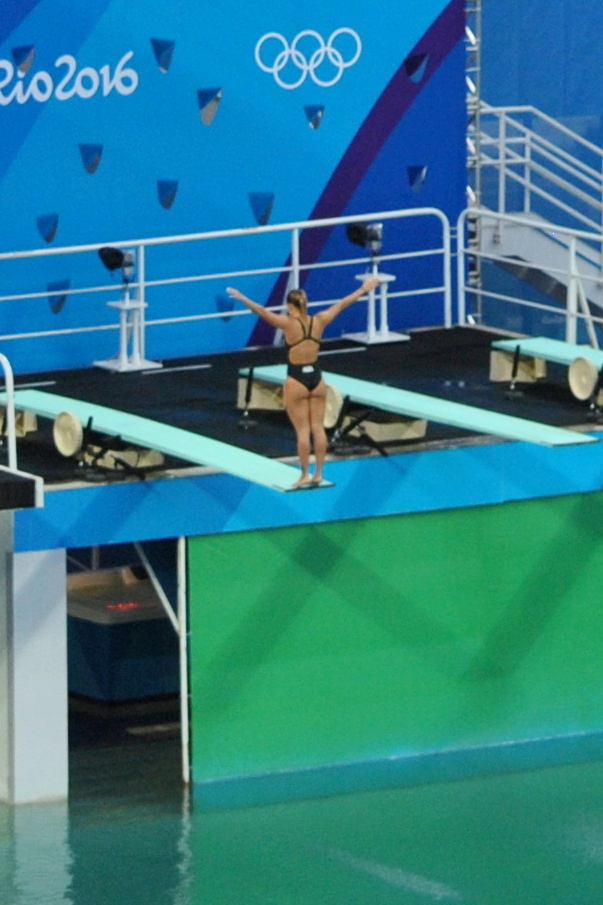
- Cui at the 2016 Rio Olympic Games

Personal information
- Nickname: Lizzie
- Born: Elizabeth Cui; 12 August 1997 (age 29) Auckland, New Zealand
- Height: 1.59 m (5 ft 3 in)
- Weight: 56 kg (123 lb)

Sport
- Sport: Diving

Elizabeth Roussel (née Cui, born 12 August 1997) is a New Zealand diver.

She competed at the 2015 World Aquatics Championships. Cui is a five-time national champion and record holder. In heading to the 2016 Olympics, Cui marked the first time New Zealand had been represented in the sport since the 1992 Olympic Games in Barcelona. Cui competed for LSU from 2016 to 2019 and remains one of the most decorated diving athletes in LSU history. Cui still holds the women's 3 meter record and ended her career gaining two more SEC silver medals to her collection making it four SEC medals. In her athletic career, Cui placed fifth at her second year and sixth in her senior year at the NCAA championships in the 1 meter springboard event. Her highest 3 meter placing at the NCAA championships was tenth in her senior season.

She won bronze at the 2023 Oceania Championships in the 3m springboard and placed 14th in the same event at the 2023 World Championships.

She was the first New Zealand diver to compete at the Olympic Games in 24 years when she contested the 3m event in the 2016 Olympics on her 18th birthday

She also competed at the 2018 Commonwealth Games.

Roussel began diving at the age of nine. She was awarded a diving scholarship to Louisiana State University as a teenager, and is now based in Louisiana with her partner and child.

Roussel (née Cui) competed in the women's 3 meter springboard diving event in the Paris 2024 Olympic Games and was eliminated after the first round.

== See also ==
- New Zealand at the 2015 World Aquatics Championships
