= Chang Yani =

Chinese diver (born 2001)

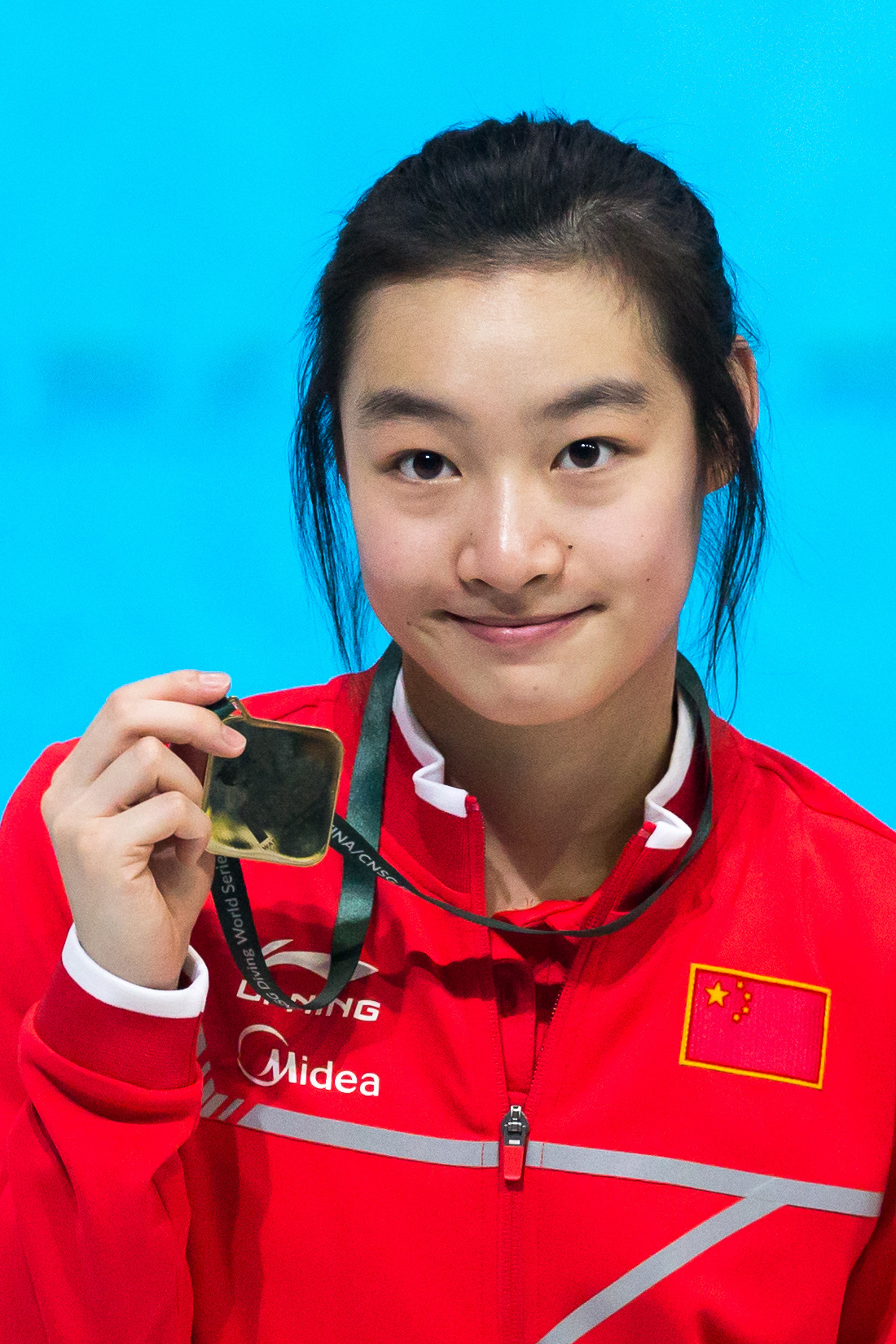
- Chang in 2019

Personal information
- Nationality: Chinese
- Born: 7 December 2001 (age 24) Xiantao, Hubei, China
- Height: 1.60 m (5 ft 3 in)

Sport
- Country: China
- Sport: Diving
Medal record
Women's diving
Representing China
Olympic Games
Gold medal – first place	2024 Paris	3 m synchro
Bronze medal – third place	2024 Paris	3 m springboard
World Championships
Gold medal – first place	2017 Budapest	3 m synchro
Gold medal – first place	2022 Budapest	3 m synchro
Gold medal – first place	2023 Fukuoka	3 m synchro
Gold medal – first place	2024 Doha	3 m synchro
Gold medal – first place	2024 Doha	3 m springboard
Silver medal – second place	2023 Fukuoka	3 m springboard
Bronze medal – third place	2022 Budapest	3 m springboard
Asian Games
Gold medal – first place	2018 Jakarta-Palembang	3 m synchro
Gold medal – first place	2022 Hangzhou	3 m synchro
Silver medal – second place	2022 Hangzhou	3 m springboard

Chang Yani (Chinese: 昌雅妮; pinyin: Chāng Yǎnī; born 7 December 2001) is a Chinese diver.

Chang won all four legs of the 2016 FINA Diving World Series in the 10 metre mixed platform synchronized event together with Tai Xiaohu. In the 2017 FINA Diving World Series Chang won two gold medals in the women's synchronized 10 metre platform event together with Ren Qian.

Together with Shi Tingmao she won two gold medals in the women's synchronized 3 metre springboard event. The pair became world champions at the 2017 World Aquatics Championships in Budapest. They won gold at the 2018 FINA Diving World Cup and the 2018 Asian Games as well.

At the 2019 World Aquatics Championships Chang participated in the 1 metre springboard final, where she reached rank six. In the same discipline Chang won silver at the 2019 Military World Games.

At the 2024 Summer Olympics in Paris, Chang together with Chen Yiwen won their first Olympic gold medals in the women's synchronized 3m springboard on 28 July 2024. She then won the bronze in women's 3m springboard despite "a shaky first dive [that] saw her at the bottom of the standings".
