= Brittany Viola =

American diver (born 1987)

Personal information
- Full name: Brittany Ann Viola
- National team: USA
- Born: April 19, 1987 (age 39) Minnesota, U.S.
- Home town: Orlando, Florida, U.S.
- Height: 5 ft 5 in (1.65 m)

Sport
- Country: United States
- Rank: Elite
- Event: Women's 10M Platform
- College team: University of Miami
- Coached by: Randy Ableman

Brittany Ann Viola (born April 19, 1987 in Minnesota) is an American platform diver formerly for the University of Miami. In 2008 and 2011, she won the NCAA championship in diving's ten-meter platform. She was named to the United States diving team for the 2009 World Aquatics Championships and 2011 World Aquatics Championships held in Rome and Shanghai, respectively. Viola was named Captain of the U.S. Diving Team for the 2009 event.

Viola's Olympic dreams began when she watched the Magnificent Seven U.S. Gymnastics Team win gold in Atlanta in 1996. She came close to making the 2004 U.S. Olympic Diving Team, finishing second on the 10-meter platform at the U.S. Olympic Team Trials while still in high school. Prior to attending the University of Miami, Viola attended and graduated in 2005 from Lake Highland Preparatory School in Orlando, Florida. While in high school she trained with what is now YCF Diving at the YMCA Aquatic Center in Orlando, FL. In 2008 Viola was named an alternate for the U.S. Olympic Diving Team after finishing fourth in the trials. Among her greatest accomplishments in competitive diving Viola placed second in the U.S. Grand Prix in Fort Lauderdale, FL, in 2009.

In June 2012, Viola easily took first place in the U.S. Olympic Team Trials and sealed her place on the U.S. Olympic team. She was ahead of the second place member, Katie Bell, by nearly 60 points. In London, she advanced from preliminaries to the semi-final round but finished in 15th place, 3 spots short of advancing to the finals.

Viola was the Student Athlete Advisor Committee (SAAC) President first for the University of Miami from 2008 to 2011, and then the SAAC Chairman for the ACC for the 2008/2009 academic year.

She is the daughter of former Minnesota Twins pitcher, Frank Viola. Originally trained in gymnastics, she retired at the age of 13 to concentrate on diving because she did not want to move away from home to train.

== Championships ==
At the 2011 US National Championships in August, Viola captured the senior women platform championship at UCLA's Spieker Aquatics Center.

== Coaching career ==
Viola signed with Athletes Untapped as a mental performance coach on Apr 7, 2024.
