= Kassidy Cook =

American diver (born 1995)

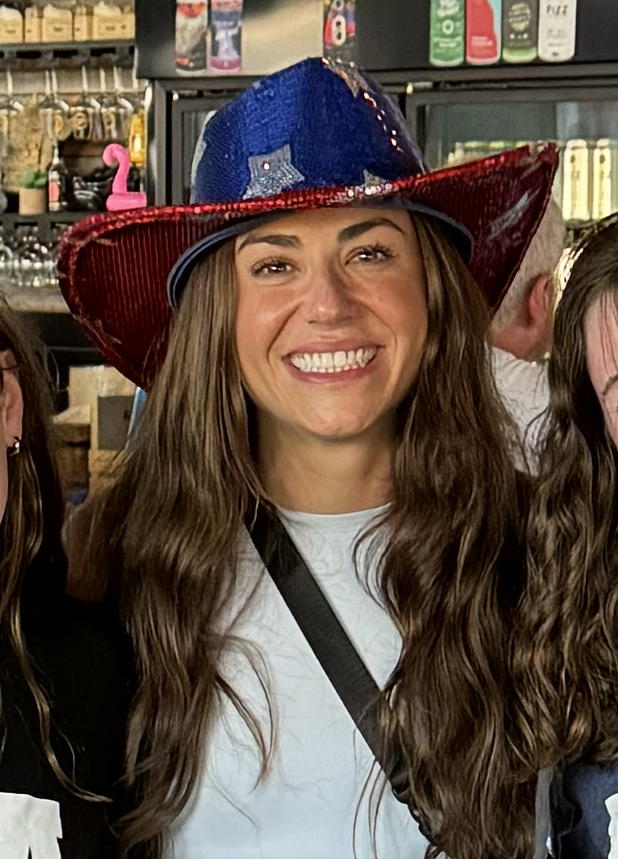
- Cook in 2024

Personal information
- Born: Kassidy Leigh Cook; May 9, 1995 (age 31) Plantation, Florida, U.S.
- Home town: The Woodlands, Texas, U.S.
- Education: Stanford University
- Height: 5 ft 3 in (160 cm)
- Weight: 126 lb (57 kg)

Sport
- Country: United States
- Sport: Diving
- Events: 3 m springboard 3 m synchronized springboard
- Team: United States National Diving Team: 2010, 2011, 2012, 2013, 2016, 2017
- Coached by: John Appleman, Kenny Armstrong, Bob Gunter

Achievements and titles
- World finals: 2010 FINA Junior World Championships: 1 m springboard; Gold; 3 m springboard; Gold
- National finals: 2007 Speedo National Junior Diving Championships: 1 m springboard; Gold 3 m springboard; Gold; 2008 Speedo National Junior Diving Championships: 1 m springboard; Gold 3 m springboard; Gold 10 m platform; Silver; 2009 Speedo National Junior Diving Championships: 1 m springboard; Gold 3 m springboard; Gold 10 m platform; Bronze; 2010 USA Diving Winter National Championships: 1 m springboard; Bronze; 2010 USA Diving Junior National Championships: 1 m springboard; Gold 3 m springboard; Gold; 2010 AT&T National Diving Championships: 1 m springboard; Gold
Medal record
Women's diving
Representing the United States
Olympic Games
Silver medal – second place	2024 Paris	3 m synchro
Pan American Games
Bronze medal – third place	2011 Guadalajara	3 m synchro
- Updated on April 1, 2013

Kassidy Leigh Cook (born May 9, 1995) is an American diver. Cook was a member of the United States national diving team in 2012. She missed out on competing in the 2012 Summer Olympics by 0.4 points, but competed in the 2016 Summer Olympics, placing 13th in the women's 3 metre springboard event. She earned her first Olympic medal in the 2024 Summer Olympics, winning silver in the women's synchronized 3 metre springboard with Sarah Bacon.

== Early life ==
Cook is the 5th child of Kevin and Laura Cook and lives in The Woodlands, Texas. She has five siblings: Kevin, Kara, Kelsey, Kylie and Kendall. Cook started diving at the age of four; her sister, Kara, was a diver at Purdue University. Kassidy trains five hours a day, six days a week. She was a child model before she started diving. The National Interscholastic Swim Coaches Association (NISCA) named her the 2010 high school girls national champion in its diving All-American program.

Kassidy Cook graduated from The Woodlands High School in 2013 and from Stanford University in 2018.

She is good friends with British diver Tom Daley.

In October 2024, Kassidy became engaged to long term boyfriend Ryan Swingle.

== Career ==
Year	Competition	1 m springboard	3 m springboard	10 m platform
2005	Speedo Junior National Diving Championships	18th (206.60)	12th (225.66)	
2006	Speedo Junior National Diving Championships	6th (261.80)	3rd (296.15)	4th (295.35)
2007	Kaiser Permanente National Diving Championships	14th (239.65)		
2007	Speedo Junior National Diving Championships	1st (277.65)	1st (321.65)	7th (280.00)
2008	Speedo USA Diving Spring Championships	6th (233.90)		
2008	Kaiser Permanente National Diving Championships	3rd (244.30)	11th (266.25)	
2008	Speedo USA Diving Junior National Championships	1st (335.65)	1st (331.15)	2nd (328.05)
2009	Speedo USA Diving Spring National Championships	3rd (285.10)	6th (271.30)	
2009	Speedo USA Diving Junior National Diving Championships	1st (382.85)	1st (440.75)	3rd (344.60)
2009	AT&T National Diving Championships	9th (239.85)	6th (300.60)	
2010	USA Diving Winter National Championships	3rd (284.70)	9th (612.70)	
2010	USA Diving Junior National Championships	1st (400.95)	1st (430.85)	
2010	AT&T National Diving Championships	1st (299.65)	5th (339.60)	
2011	USA Diving Winter National Championships		5th (323.90)	
2011	AT&T National Diving Championships	4th (263.65)	21st (238.95)	
2012	USA Diving Winter National Championships		4th (990.20)	
2012	U.S. Olympic Team Trials		4th (962.55)	

== Olympic career ==
Cook competed at the 2016 Summer Olympics and placed 13th on the 3 meter springboard. She and Sarah Bacon, her best friend and diving partner, qualified for the 2024 Paris Olympics in the 3 meter synchronized springboard event for the United States.

On July 27, 2024, Cook and Bacon won the first medals for the United States at the 2024 Olympics, silver in the 3 meter synchronized springboard event.
