= Sayaka Mikami =

Japanese diver (born 2000)

Personal information
- Born: 8 December 2000 (age 25) Yonago, Japan
- Height: 1.56 m (5 ft 1 in)
Medal record
Women's Diving
Representing Japan
World Championships
Silver medal – second place	2022 Budapest	3 m synchro
Bronze medal – third place	2025 Singapore	Team
Asian Games
Bronze medal – third place	2022 Hangzhou	3 m springboard
Bronze medal – third place	2026 Aichi-Nagoya	3 m springboard

Sayaka Mikami (三上 紗也可, Mikami Sayaka; born 8 December 2000) is a Japanese diver. She competed in the women's 3 metre springboard event at the 2019 World Aquatics Championships. She qualified to represent Japan at the 2020 Summer Olympics.
