= 2019 Red Bull Cliff Diving World Series =

- Sport: Cliff diving
- Duration: 13 April – 14 September 2019

Men
- Overall: (gold) Gary Hunt (GBR); (silver) Jonathan Paredes (MEX); (bronze) Andy Jones (USA)

Women
- Overall: (gold) Rhiannan Iffland (AUS); (silver) Jessica Macaulay (GBR); (bronze) Lysanne Richard (CAN)

Seasons
- ← 2018 2020 →

The 2019 Red Bull Cliff Diving World Series was the 11th season of the Red Bull-sponsored international cliff diving series. The series began on 13 April in El Nido, Philippines, with the final event taking place on 14 September in Bilbao, Spain.

== Calendar ==
The 2019 calendar included three locations that were new to the series: El Nido, Dublin and Beirut. The final event took place on 14 September in Bilbao.

Date	Location	Ref.
13 April	El Nido, Palawan, Philippines	
12 May	(Republic of Ireland) Dublin, Ireland	
2 June	Polignano a Mare, Italy	
22 June	São Miguel, Azores, Portugal	
14 July	Beirut, Lebanon	
24 August	Mostar, Bosnia and Herzegovina	
14 September	Bilbao, Spain	

== Divers ==
The line-up of divers for the 2019 series was announced in November 2018. The men's series featured 10 permanent divers, with former Olympic divers Constantin Popovici and Oleksiy Pryhorov joining the permanent line-up for the first time. In the women's series, the line-up of six permanent divers included 23-year-old newcomer Eleanor Smart, who was the youngest permanent diver on the 2019 tour. In addition to the permanent divers, at least four wildcard divers were selected to compete at each stop of the men's and women's series.

Permanent divers for the 2019 series:

Men

- (United Kingdom) Blake Aldridge
- (United States) David Colturi
- (United Kingdom) Gary Hunt
- (United States) Andy Jones
- (Poland) Kris Kolanus
- (United States) Steven LoBue
- (Czech Republic) Michal Navrátil
- (Mexico) Jonathan Paredes
- (Romania) Constantin Popovici
- (Ukraine) Oleksiy Pryhorov

Women

- (Australia) Rhiannan Iffland
- (Mexico) Adriana Jiménez
- (United Kingdom) Jessica Macaulay
- (Belarus) Yana Nestsiarava
- (Canada) Lysanne Richard
- (United States) Eleanor Smart

== Standings ==
At each event, each competing diver performed four dives. The diver with the highest cumulative score after all four dives was declared the winner, and was awarded 200 points. Further points were awarded to all divers who competed at each event, based on their finishing position.

=== Men ===
The men's series featured seven events. The 10 permanent divers were joined at each event by at least four wildcard divers.

Men's Standings
Pos.	Event Diver	El Nido	Dublin (Note: No points were awarded in Dublin. The event went ahead as planned, but due to cold water temperatures the divers had to compete with revised dive lists.)	Polignano a Mare	São Miguel	Beirut	Mostar	Bilbao	Points total
1st place, gold medalist(s)	Gary Hunt (GBR)	200	0	200	200	200	160	200	1160
2nd place, silver medalist(s)	Jonathan Paredes (MEX)	130	0	60	160	110	130	160	750
3rd place, bronze medalist(s)	Andy Jones (USA)	60	0	160	130	30	70	90	540
4	Constantin Popovici (ROU)	160	0	-	-	-	200	110	470
5	Michal Navrátil (CZE)	40	0	130	110	90	40	50	460
6	David Colturi (USA)	70	0	20	60	160	9	20	339
7	Oleksiy Pryhorov (UKR)	20	0	70	90	50	60	30	320
8	Cătălin Preda (ROU)	-	-	10	70	130	90	-	300
9	Alessandro De Rose (ITA)	8	0	110	-	-	110	70	298
10	Blake Aldridge (GBR)	50	0	40	30	60	20	60	260
11	Kris Kolanus (POL)	110	0	90	20	10	-	-	230
12	Steven LoBue (USA)	90	0	50	10	70	8	-	228
13	Aidan Heslop (GBR)	-	-	-	-	-	-	130	130
14	Slavik Kolesnikov (UKR)	-	-	-	40	-	50	10	100
15	Nikita Fedotov (RUS)	10	-	-	50	-	-	-	60
16	Miguel García (COL)	-	-	-	-	8	-	40	48
17	Orlando Duque (COL)	30	0	9	-	-	-	8	47
18	Matthias Appenzeller (SUI)	-	-	-	-	40	-	-	40
19	Sergio Guzman (MEX)	9	0	-	-	-	30	-	39
20	Artem Silchenko (RUS)	-	-	30	-	-	-	-	30
21	Nathan Jimerson (USA)	-	-	-	-	20	-	-	20
22	Viktar Maslouski (BLR)	-	-	-	-	-	10	-	10
23	Manuel Halbisch (GER)	-	-	-	9	-	-	-	9
23	Alain Kohl (LUX)	-	-	-	-	9	-	-	9
23	Owen Weymouth (GBR)	-	0	-	-	-	-	9	9
26	Alberto Devora (ESP)	-	-	8	-	-	-	-	8
26	Jucelino Junior (BRA)	-	-	-	8	-	-	-	8

Key

First place
Second place
Third place
Wildcard diver

=== Women ===
The women's series featured seven events. The six permanent divers were joined at each event by at least four wildcard divers.

Women's Standings
Pos.	Event Diver	El Nido	Dublin (Note: No points were awarded in Dublin. The event went ahead as planned, but due to cold water temperatures the divers had to compete with revised dive lists.)	Polignano a Mare	São Miguel	Beirut	Mostar	Bilbao	Points total
1st place, gold medalist(s)	Rhiannan Iffland (AUS)	200	0	200	200	200	200	200	1200
2nd place, silver medalist(s)	Jessica Macaulay (GBR)	110	0	90	160	70	110	130	670
3rd place, bronze medalist(s)	Lysanne Richard (CAN)	130	0	110	130	-	130	160	660
4	Yana Nestsiarava (BLR)	160	0	130	40	130	50	70	580
5	Eleanor Smart (USA)	40	0	50	110	90	160	50	500
6	María Quintero (COL)	-	0	160	50	60	70	110	450
7	Adriana Jiménez (MEX)	90	0	-	90	160	-	-	340
8	Iris Schmidbauer (GER)	-	0	-	70	110	40	60	280
9	Xantheia Pennisi (AUS)	60	-	40	-	50	-	90	240
10	Antonina Vyshyvanova (UKR)	50	-	70	-	-	90	-	210
11	Jaki Valente (BRA)	-	-	-	60	-	30	30	120
12	Celia Fernández (ESP)	-	0	-	30	40	-	40	110
13	Genevieve Bradley (USA)	-	-	-	-	30	60	-	90
14	Ginger Huber (USA)	70	0	-	-	-	-	-	70
15	Aimee Harrison (CAN)	-	-	60	-	-	-	-	60

Key

First place
Second place
Third place
Wildcard diver
