= High diving at the 2017 World Aquatics Championships – Men =

Men at the 2017 World Aquatics Championships
- Venue: Batthyány square
- Location: Budapest, Hungary
- Dates: 28 July (Round 1–2); 30 July (Round 3–4)
- Competitors: 22 from 14 nations
- Winning points: 397.15

Medalists
gold medal	Steve LoBue	United States
silver medal	Michal Navrátil	Czech Republic
bronze medal	Alessandro De Rose	Italy

The Men competition at the 2017 World Championships was held on 28 and 30 July 2017.

== Results ==
The first two rounds were held on 28 July at 14:30. The last two rounds were held on 30 July at 12:00.

Rank	Diver	Nationality	Round 1	Round 2	Round 3	Round 4	Total
1st place, gold medalist(s)	Steve LoBue	United States	70.00	114.75	99.00	113.40	397.15
2nd place, silver medalist(s)	Michal Navrátil	Czech Republic	71.40	119.85	90.00	109.65	390.90
3rd place, bronze medalist(s)	Alessandro De Rose	Italy	68.60	101.05	97.20	112.80	379.65
4	Andy Jones	United States	70.00	96.60	91.80	109.65	368.05
5	Gary Hunt	Great Britain	72.80	132.60	81.00	70.00	356.40
6	Orlando Duque	Colombia	68.60	110.40	86.40	89.70	355.10
7	Miguel García	Colombia	71.40	118.80	81.00	73.60	344.80
8	Jonathan Paredes	Mexico	72.80	102.50	81.00	86.95	343.25
9	Blake Aldridge	Great Britain	67.20	110.40	91.80	72.85	342.25
10	David Colturi	United States	74.20	108.10	86.40	71.30	340.00
11	Oleksiy Pryhorov	Ukraine	65.80	82.80	82.80	98.90	330.30
12	Sergio Guzmán	Mexico	67.20	92.45	81.60	87.75	329.00
13	Nikita Fedotov	Russia	71.40	75.25	84.60	did not advance	231.25
14	Viktar Maslouski	Belarus	71.40	77.40	81.00	did not advance	229.80
15	Artem Silchenko	Russia	65.80	89.70	73.80	did not advance	229.30
16	Kris Kolanus	Poland	75.60	54.05	91.80	did not advance	221.45
17	Alain Kohl	Luxembourg	67.20	64.50	75.60	did not advance	207.30
18	Todor Spasov	Bulgaria	63.45	83.85	57.60	did not advance	204.90
19	Igor Semashko	Russia	56.70	55.65	91.80	did not advance	204.15
20	Murilo Marques	Brazil	67.20	47.15	80.60	did not advance	194.95
21	Cyrille Oumedjkane	France	63.00	55.35	76.50	did not advance	194.85
22	Owen Weymouth	Great Britain	51.80	67.65	70.20	did not advance	189.65
