= 2017 in aquatic sports =

This article lists the in the water and on the water forms of aquatic sports for 2017.

== Aquatics (FINA) ==
=== World aquatics championships ===
- July 14–30: 2017 World Aquatics Championships in (Hungary) Budapest
  - The United States won both the gold and overall medal tallies.
- August 7–20: 2017 FINA World Masters Championships in (Hungary) Budapest
  - For results, click here.
- August 23–28: 2017 FINA World Junior Swimming Championships in Indianapolis
  - The United States won both the gold and overall medal tallies.
- November 27 – December 7: 2017 World Para Swimming Championships in Mexico City
  - Note: Due to the 2017 Chiapas earthquake, the championships was postponed until the end of November 2017.
  - China won both the gold and overall medal tallies.

=== 2017 FINA 10 km Marathon Swimming World Cup ===
- February 4: MSWC #1 in (Argentina) Carmen de Patagones-Viedma, Río Negro
  - Winners: (Italy) Federico Vanelli (m) / (Italy) Arianna Bridi (f)
- March 11: MSWC #2 in (United Arab Emirates) Abu Dhabi
  - Winners: (United Kingdom) Jack Burnell (m) / (France) Aurélie Muller (f)
- June 24: MSWC #3 in (Portugal) Setúbal
  - Winners: (Hungary) Kristóf Rasovszky (m) / (Italy) Rachele Bruni (f)
- July 27: MSWC #4 in (Canada) Lac Saint-Jean
  - Winners: (Italy) Simone Ruffini (m) / (Italy) Arianna Bridi (f)
- August 12: MSWC #5 in (Canada) Lake Mégantic
  - Winners: (Hungary) Kristóf Rasovszky (m) / (Brazil) Ana Marcela Cunha (f)
- October 15: MSWC #6 in (China) Chun'an County (Hangzhou)
  - Winners: (Hungary) Kristóf Rasovszky (m) / (Brazil) Ana Marcela Cunha (f)
- October 21: MSWC #7 (final) in Hong Kong
  - Winners: (Germany) Rob Muffels (m) / (Italy) Arianna Bridi (f)

=== 2017 FINA Open Water Swimming Grand Prix ===
- February 5: OWGP #1 in (Argentina) Santa Fe-Coronda
  - Winners: (Argentina) Damián Blaum (m) / (Italy) Barbara Pozzobon (f)
- July 29: OWGP #2 in (Canada) Lac Saint-Jean
  - Winners: (Argentina) Guillermo Bertola (m) / (Italy) Martina Grimaldi (f)
- August 19: OWGP #3 in (North Macedonia) Lake Ohrid
  - Winners: (Germany) Alexander Studzinski (m) / (Italy) Barbara Pozzobon (f)
- September 3: OWGP #4 (final) in (Italy) Capri-Naples
  - Winners: (Italy) Matteo Furlan (m) / (Brazil) Ana Marcela Cunha (f)

=== 2017 FINA Diving World Series ===
- March 3–5: DWS #1 in Beijing
  - 3m Springboard winners: (United Kingdom) Jack Laugher (m) / (China) Shi Tingmao (f)
  - 10m Platform winners: (China) Chen Aisen (m) / (China) Si Yajie (f)
  - Synchronized 3m winners: China (Cao Yuan & Xie Siyi) (m) / China (Shi Tingmao & XU Zhihuan) (f)
  - Synchronized 10m winners: China (Chen Aisen & Yang Hao) (m) / China (Chang Yani & Ren Qian) (f)
  - Mixed winners: China (Wang Han & LI Zheng) (3m) / China (LIAN Jie & LIAN Junjie) (10m)
- March 9–11: DWS #2 in Guangzhou
  - 3m Springboard winners: (China) Xie Siyi (m) / (China) Shi Tingmao (f)
  - 10m Platform winners: (China) Chen Aisen (m) / (China) Si Yajie (f)
  - Synchronized 3m winners: China (Xie Siyi & Cao Yuan) (m) / China (Shi Tingmao & XU Zhihuan) (f)
  - Synchronized 10m winners: China (Chen Aisen & Yang Hao) (m) / China (Chang Yani & Ren Qian) (f)
  - Mixed winners: China (Wang Han & LI Zheng) (3m) / China (LIAN Jie & LIAN Junjie) (10m)
- March 31 – April 2: DWS #3 in (Russia) Kazan
  - 3m Springboard winners: (China) Cao Yuan (m) / (China) Shi Tingmao (f)
  - 10m Platform winners: (China) Chen Aisen (m) / (China) Ren Qian (f)
  - Synchronized 3m winners: China (Xie Siyi & Cao Yuan) (m) / China (Chang Yani & Shi Tingmao) (f)
  - Synchronized 10m winners: China (Chen Aisen & Yang Hao) (m) / China (Ren Qian & Si Yajie) (f)
  - Mixed winners: China (Wang Han & LI Zheng) (3m) / China (LIAN Jie & LIAN Junjie) (10m)
- April 21–23: DWS #4 in (Canada) Windsor, Ontario (final)
  - 3m Springboard winners: (United Kingdom) Jack Laugher (m) / (China) Shi Tingmao (f)
  - 10m Platform winners: (China) Chen Aisen (m) / (China) Si Yajie (f)
  - Synchronized 3m winners: Russia (Evgeny Kuznetsov & Ilya Zakharov) (m) / China (Chang Yani & Shi Tingmao) (f)
  - Synchronized 10m winners: China (Chen Aisen & Yang Hao) (m) / China (Ren Qian & Si Yajie) (f)
  - Mixed winners: China (Wang Han & LI Zheng) (3m) / China (LIAN Jie & LIAN Junjie) (10m)

=== 2017 FINA Diving Grand Prix ===
- February 24–26: DGP #1 in Rostock
  - 3m Springboard winners: (China) PENG Jianfeng (m) / (China) WU Chunting (f)
  - 10m Platform winners: (China) Yang Jian (m) / (China) Zhang Minjie (f)
  - Synchronized 3m winners: Germany (Stephan Feck & Patrick Hausding) (m) / Canada (Melissa Citrini Beaulieu & Jennifer Abel) (f)
  - Synchronized 10m winners: Russia (Roman Izmailov & Sergey Nazin) (m; default) / China (Zhang Minjie & Zhang Jiaqi) (f)
- April 6–9: DGP #2 in Gatineau
  - 3m Springboard winners: (China) He Chao (m) / (China) JIA Dongjin (f)
  - 10m Platform winners: (China) Yang Jian (m) / (Japan) Nana Sasaki (f)
  - Synchronized 3m winners: China (He Chao & LIU Chengming) (m) / China (CHEN Huiling & JIA Dongjin) (f)
  - Synchronized 10m winners: Great Britain (Matthew Dixon & Noah Williams) (m) / China (Liu Xin & ZHANG Rui) (f)
  - Mixed Synchronized winners: Canada (Jennifer Abel & François Imbeau-Dulac) (3m) / Japan (Kazuki Murakami & Minami Itahashi) (10m)
- May 4–7: DGP #3 in San Juan, Puerto Rico
  - 3m Springboard winners: (Colombia) Sebastián Morales (m) / (China) Chen Yiwen (f)
  - 10m Platform winners: (United Kingdom) Matty Lee (m) / (China) LIU Xin (f)
  - Synchronized 3m winners: Great Britain (Freddy Woodward & James Heatly) (m) / China (Liu Lingrui & Huang Xiaohui) (f)
  - Synchronized 10m winners: China (XU Zewei & Tai Xiaohu) (m) / China (Liu Xin & ZHANG Rui) (f)
  - Mixed Synchronized winners: Japan (Nishida Reo & Hazuki Miyamoto) (3m) / Great Britain (Matty Lee & Robyn Birch) (10m)
- May 26–28: DGP #4 in (Spain) Madrid
  - 3m Springboard winners: (Italy) Giovanni Tocci (m) / (Canada) Pamela Ware (f)
  - 10m Platform winners: (Mexico) Randal Willars Valdez (m) / (China) Zhang Jiaqi (f)
  - Synchronized 3m winners: Canada (François Imbeau-Dulac & Peter Thach Mai) (m) / Canada (Mia Vallee & Olivia Chamandy) (f)
  - Synchronized 10m winners: Mexico (Kevin Berlin Reyes & Jose Diego Balleza Isaias) (m) / China (Zhang Jiaqi & Zhang Minjie) (f)
- July 5–7: DGP #5 in Bolzano
  - 3m Springboard winners: (Colombia) Sebastián Morales (m) / (Japan) Yuka Mabuchi (f)
  - 10m Platform winners: (Brazil) Isaac Souza Filho (m) / (China) ZHANG Nanju (f)
  - Synchronized 3m winners: Russia (Evgenii Novoselov & Viacheslav Novoselov) (m) / Great Britain (Yasmin Harper & Scarlett Mew Jensen) (f)
  - Synchronized 10m winners: Russia (Egor Galperin & Boris Efremov) (m; default) / Italy (Chiara Pellacani & Noemi Batki) (f)
  - Mixed Synchronized winners: Italy (Elena Bertocchi & Maicol Verzotto) (3m) / Italy (Noemi Batki & Maicol Verzotto) (10m)
- October 26–29: DGP #6 in Kuala Lumpur
  - 3m Springboard winners: (South Korea) Woo Ha-ram (m) / (China) Wang Han (f)
  - 10m Platform winners: (China) Tai Xiaohu (m) / (China) ZHANG Jiaqi (f)
  - Synchronized 3m winners: South Korea (Kim Yeong-nam & Woo Ha-ram) (m) / Japan (Hazuki Miyamoto & Sayaka Mikami) (f)
  - Synchronized 10m winners: South Korea (Kim Yeong-nam & Woo Ha-ram) (m) / Malaysia (Leong Mun Yee & Pandelela Rinong) (f)
  - Mixed Synchronized winners: Japan (Hazuki Miyamoto & Nishida Reo) (3m) / Malaysia (Cheong Jun Hoong & Jellson Jabillin) (10m)
- November 2–5: DGP #7 in Singapore
  - 3m Springboard winners: (South Korea) Kim Yeong-nam (m) / (China) Chen Yiwen (f)
  - 10m Platform winners: (China) Tai Xiaohu (m) / (China) ZHANG Jiaqi (f)
  - Synchronized 3m winners: South Korea (Kim Yeong-nam & Woo Ha-ram) (m) / Great Britain (Yasmin Harper & Scarlett Mew Jensen) (f)
  - Synchronized 10m winners: South Korea (Kim Yeong-nam & Woo Ha-ram) (m) / North Korea (KIM Kwang Hui & KIM Mi Hwa) (f)
  - Mixed Synchronized winners: South Korea (Kim Su-ji & Woo Ha-ram) (3m) / South Korea (CHO Eun-bi & Kim Yeong-nam) (10m)
- November 9–12: DGP #8 (final) in Gold Coast, Queensland
  - 3m Springboard winners: (China) Xie Siyi (m) / (China) Chen Yiwen (f)
  - 10m Platform winners: (China) Yang Jian (m) / (Malaysia) Pandelela Rinong (f)
  - Synchronized 3m winners: China (Cao Yuan & Xie Siyi) (m) / United States (Krysta Palmer & Maria Coburn) (f)
  - Synchronized 10m winners: Russia (Aleksandr Belevtsev & Nikita Shleikher) (m) / Australia (Melissa Wu & Taneka Kovchenko) (f)
  - Mixed Synchronized winners: Germany (Martin Wolfram & Tina Punzel) (3m) / Great Britain (Gemma McArthur & Lucas Thomson) (10m)

=== 2017 FINA High Diving World Cup ===
- April 27–29: 2017 FINA High Diving World Cup in (United Arab Emirates) Abu Dhabi
  - Women's 20 m winner: (Mexico) Rita Jimenez Trejo
  - Men's 27 m winner: (United Kingdom) Gary Hunt

=== 2017 FINA Swimming World Cup ===
- August 2 & 3: SWC #1 in Moscow
  - Russia won both the gold and overall medal tallies.
- August 6 & 7: SWC #2 in (Germany) Berlin
  - Hungary won the gold medal tally. The Netherlands won the overall medal tally.
- August 11 & 12: SWC #3 in Eindhoven
  - South Africa and Russia won 4 gold medals each. The Netherlands won the overall medal tally.
- September 30 & October 1: SWC #4 in Hong Kong
  - South Africa won the gold medal tally. The Netherlands won the overall medal tally.
- October 4 & 5: SWC #5 in (Qatar) Doha
  - Hungary won the gold medal tally. China and the Netherlands won 13 overall medals each.
- November 10 & 11: SWC #6 in Beijing
  - China won both the gold and overall medal tallies.
- November 14 & 15: SWC #7 in Tokyo
  - Japan and Australia won 5 gold medals each. Japan won the overall medal tally.
- November 18 & 19: SWC #8 (final) in Singapore
  - Australia and Russia won 5 gold medals each. Australia won the overall medal tally.

=== 2017 FINA Synchronized Swimming World Series ===
- March 10–12: SSWS #1 in (France) Paris
  - Free/Technical Solo winner: (Ukraine) Anna Voloshyna
  - Free/Technical Duet winners: China (Jiang Wenwen & Jiang Tingting)
  - Free/Technical Mixed Duet winners: Italy (Manila Flamini & Giorgio Minisini)
  - Free Combination & Team Routine winners: Japan
- April 22–24: SSWS #2 in Taiyuan
  - Free/Technical Solo winners: (Malaysia) Lee Lee / (United States) Anita Alvarez
  - Free/Technical Duet winners: China (Li Xiaolu & Sun Wenyan)
  - Free/Technical Mixed Duet winners: China (SHI Haoyu & SHENG Shuwen)
  - Free Combination & Team Routine winners: China
- April 28–30: SSWS #3 in Tokyo
  - Free/Technical Solo winner: (Spain) Ona Carbonell
  - Free/Technical Duet winners: Japan (Yukiko Inui & Kanami Nakamaki) / Japan (Yukiko Inui & Mai Nakamura)
  - Free Mixed Duet winners: Japan (Abe Atsushi & Yumi Adachi)
  - Free Combination & Team Routine winners: Japan
- May 2–7: SSWS #4 in Toronto
  - Free/Technical Solo winner: (Ukraine) Anna Voloshyna
  - Free/Technical Duet winner: Ukraine (Anna Voloshyna & Yelyzaveta Yakhno)
  - Free/Technical Mixed Duet winners: Canada (Robert Prévost & Isabelle Rampling) (default)
  - Free Combination & Team Routine winners: Ukraine
- May 25–28: SSWS #5 in Las Palmas
  - Free/Technical Solo winner: (Spain) Ona Carbonell
  - Free/Technical Duet winners: Spain (Ona Carbonell & Paula Ramirez)
  - Free/Technical Mixed Duet winners: Japan (Yumi Adachi & Abe Atsushi)
  - Free Combination & Team Routine winners: Ukraine
- June 22–24: SSWS #6 in Long Island (East Meadow, New York)
  - Solo winner: (Spain) Ona Carbonell
  - Duet winners: Spain (Ona Carbonell & Paula Ramirez)
  - Team winners: United States
  - Mixed Duet winners: United States (Kanako Spendlove & Bill May)
- September 21–24: SSWS #7 (final) in (Uzbekistan) Tashkent
  - Solo winner: (Spain) Ona Carbonell
  - Duet winners: Ukraine (Anna Voloshyna & Yelyzaveta Yakhno)
  - Team winners: Ukraine
  - Mixed Duet winners: Japan (Abe Atsushi & Yumi Adachi)

=== LEN (Aquatics) ===
- May 5–7: 2017 European Synchronised Swimming Champions Cup in Cuneo
  - Free/Technical Duet winners: Spain (Ona Carbonell & Paula Ramirez) (2 times)
  - Free/Technical Mixed Duet winners: Italy (Manila Flamini & Giorgio Minisini) (2 times)
  - Free/Technical Team winners: Italy (2 times)
  - Team Highlight winners: Greece
  - Free Combination winners: Ukraine
- June 12–18: 2017 European Diving Championships in Kyiv
  - 1m Springboard winners: (Ukraine) Illya Kvasha (m) / (Italy) Elena Bertocchi (f)
  - 3m Springboard winners: (Russia) Ilya Zakharov (m) / (Ukraine) Hanna Pysmenska (f)
  - 10m Platform winners: (France) Benjamin Auffret (m) / (United Kingdom) Lois Toulson (f)
  - Synchronized 3m winners: Russia (Ilya Zakharov & Evgeny Kuznetsov) (m) / Russia (Nadezhda Bazhina & Kristina Ilinykh) (f)
  - Synchronized 10m winners: Ukraine (Maksym Dolhov & Oleksandr Horshkovozov) (m) / Great Britain (Ruby Bower & Phoebe Banks) (f)
  - Mixed winners: Italy (Elena Bertocchi & Maicol Verzotto) (3m) / Great Britain (Lois Toulson & Matty Lee) (10m)
  - Team event winners: France (Laura Marino & Matthieu Rosset)
- June 21–25: 2017 European Junior Synchronised Swimming Championship in (Serbia) Belgrade
  - Solo Preliminary/Free winners: (Russia) Tatiana Gayday
  - Duo Preliminary/Free winners: Russia (Milena Maretich & Karina Tashagadzhieva)
  - Team Preliminary/Free winners: Russia
  - Free Combination Preliminary/Free winners: Russia
  - Figures winner: (Russia) Daria Kulagina
- June 27 – July 2: 2017 European Junior Diving Championship in (Norway) Bergen
  - 1m Springboard winners: (Switzerland) Jonathan Suckow (m) / (Russia) Ekaterina Nekrasova (f)
  - 3m Springboard winners: (Russia) Nikita Nikolaev (m) / (Russia) Ekaterina Nekrasova (f)
  - 10m Platform winners: (United Kingdom) Matthew Dixon (m) / (Russia) Anna Chuinyshena (f)
  - Synchronized 3m Springboard winners: Germany (Patrick Kreisel & Lou Massenberg) (m) / Russia (Ekaterina Nekrasova & Uliana Kliueva) (f)
  - Synchronized 10m Platform winners: Russia (Ruslan Ternovoi & Maksim Malofeev) (m) / Ukraine (Sofiia Lyskun & Valeriia Liulko) (f)
  - Mixed winners: Russia
- June 28 – July 2: 2017 European Junior Swimming Championships in (Israel) Netanya
  - Russia and Hungary won 11 gold medals each. Russia won the overall medal tally.
- August 4–6: 2017 European Junior Open Water Swimming Championships in Marseille
  - Junior 5 km winners: (Hungary) Szilar Galyassy (m) / (Italy) Giulia Salin (f)
  - Men's Junior 7.5 km winner: (France) Clement Batte
  - Junior 10 km winners: (France) Logan Fontaine (m) / (Hungary) Melinda Novoszath (f)
  - Junior 5 km mixed relay (14–16 years old) winners: Russia (Daniil Orlov, Ekaterina Zotova, Yana Kurtseva, & Nikita Khotko)
  - Junior 5 km mixed relay (14–19 years old) winners: France (Oceane Cassignol, Clement Batte, Lisa Pou, & Logan Fontaine)
- December 13–17: 2017 European Short Course Swimming Championships in (Denmark) Copenhagen
  - Russia won both the gold and overall medal tallies.

=== 2017 Red Bull Cliff Diving World Series ===
- June 24: #1 in (Republic of Ireland) Serpent's Lair, Inis Mór
  - Winners: (United Kingdom) Gary Hunt (m) / (Australia) Rhiannan Iffland (f)
- July 9: #2 in (Portugal) Vila Franca do Campo, São Miguel, Azores
  - Winners: (Colombia) Orlando Duque (m) / (Mexico) Adriana Jimenez (f)
- July 23: #3 in (Italy) Bastione di Santo Stefano, Polignano a Mare
  - Winners: (Italy) Alessandro De Rose (m) / (Australia) Rhiannan Iffland (f)
- September 3: #4 in (United States) Possum Kingdom Lake, Texas
  - Winners: (United Kingdom) Blake Aldridge (m) / (Australia) Rhiannan Iffland (f)
- September 16: #5 in (Bosnia and Herzegovina) Stari Most, Mostar
  - Winners: (United Kingdom) Gary Hunt (m) / (United States) Cesilie Carlton (f)
- October 21: #6 (final) in (Chile) Saltos de Riñinahue, Lago Ranco
  - Winners: (Mexico) Jonathan Paredes (m) / (Australia) Rhiannan Iffland (f)

== Canoeing ==
=== Canoe sprint ===
- April 8 – September 24: 2017 ICF Canoe Sprint Schedule

==== International canoe sprint championships ====
- June 22–25: 2017 European Junior and U23 Canoe Sprint Championships in (Serbia) Belgrade
  - Ukraine won the gold medal tally. Hungary won the overall medal tally.
- July 14–16: 2017 Canoe Sprint European Championships in (Bulgaria) Plovdiv
  - Hungary won both the gold and overall medal tallies.
- July 27–30: 2017 ICF Junior and U23 Canoe Sprint World Championships in (Romania) Pitești
  - Junior: Hungary won both the gold and overall medal tallies.
  - U23: Belarus won the gold medal tally. Hungary won the overall medal tally.
- August 23–27: 2017 ICF Canoe Sprint World Championships in (Czech Republic) Račice
  - Germany won both the gold and overall medal tallies.

==== 2017 Canoe Sprint World Cup ====
- May 19–21: #1 in (Portugal) Montemor-o-Velho
  - Hungary and Ukraine won 5 gold medals each. Hungary won the overall medal tally.
- May 26–28: #2 in Szeged
  - Hungary won both the gold and overall medal tallies.
- June 2–4: #3 (final) in (Serbia) Belgrade
  - Belarus won both the gold and overall medal tallies.

=== Canoe slalom ===
- January 28 – October 8: 2017 ICF Canoe Slalom Schedule

==== International canoe slalom championships ====
- January 28–30: 2017 Oceania Canoe Slalom Championships in (New Zealand) Auckland
  - C1 winners: (United Kingdom) Ryan Westley (m) / (Australia) Jessica Fox (f)
  - K1 winners: (United States) Michal Smolen (m) / (Australia) Jessica Fox (f)
- May 31 – June 4: 2017 European Canoe Slalom Championships in (Slovenia) Tacen
  - France and Great Britain won 2 gold medals each. The Czech Republic won the overall medal tally.
- July 18–23: 2017 ICF World Junior and U23 Canoe Slalom Championships in (Slovakia) Bratislava
  - Junior: Germany won the gold medal tally. The Czech Republic won the overall medal tally.
  - U23: The Czech Republic won both the gold and overall medal tallies.
- August 17–20: 2017 European Junior and U23 Canoe Slalom Championships in (Germany) Hagen-Hohenlimburg
  - The Czech Republic won both the gold and overall medal tallies.
- September 27 – October 1: 2017 ICF Canoe Slalom World Championships in (France) Pau
  - The Czech Republic won both the gold and overall medal tallies.

==== 2017 Canoe Slalom World Cup ====
- June 16–18: #1 in Prague
  - C1 winners: (Germany) Sideris Tasiadis (m) / (United Kingdom) Kimberley Woods (f)
  - Men's C2 winners: Czech Republic (Jonáš Kašpar & Marek Šindler)
  - K1 winners: (Czech Republic) Vít Přindiš (m) / (Spain) Maialen Chourraut (f)
  - Mixed C2 winners: Czech Republic (Tereza Fišerová & Jakub Jáně)
  - Extreme K1 winners: (New Zealand) Michael Dawson (m) / (Czech Republic) Amálie Hilgertová (f)
- June 23–25: #2 in Augsburg
  - C1 winners: (Slovakia) Matej Beňuš (m) / (Australia) Jessica Fox (f)
  - Men's C2 winners: Germany (Robert Behling & Thomas Becker)
  - K1 winners: (Czech Republic) Vít Přindiš (m) / (Germany) Ricarda Funk (f)
  - Extreme K1 winners: (France) Boris Neveu (m) / (Germany) Jasmin Schornberg (f)
- June 30 – July 2: #3 in (Germany) Markkleeberg
  - C1 winners: (Slovakia) Michal Martikán (m) / (Australia) Jessica Fox (f)
  - Men's C2 winners: Czech Republic (Jonáš Kašpar & Marek Šindler)
  - K1 winners: (Italy) Giovanni De Gennaro (m) / (Germany) Ricarda Funk (f)
  - Extreme K1 winners: (Czech Republic) Vít Přindiš (m) / (Czech Republic) Tereza Fišerová (f)
- September 1–3: #4 in (Italy) Ivrea
  - C1 winners: (Germany) Sideris Tasiadis (m) / (Australia) Jessica Fox (f)
  - Men's C2 winners: Slovakia (Ladislav Škantár & Peter Škantár)
  - K1 winners: (Czech Republic) Vít Přindiš (m) / (Germany) Ricarda Funk (f)
  - Extreme K1 winners: (Germany) Hannes Aigner (m) / (Brazil) Ana Sátila (f)
- September 8–10: #5 (final) in (Spain) La Seu d'Urgell
  - C1 winners: (Slovenia) Benjamin Savšek (m) / (Spain) Núria Vilarrubla (f)
  - Men's C2 winners: Germany (Robert Behling & Thomas Becker)
  - K1 winners: (Slovenia) Peter Kauzer (m) / (Germany) Ricarda Funk (f)
  - Extreme K1 winners: (Germany) Hannes Aigner (m) / (Netherlands) Martina Wegman (f)

=== Other international canoeing events ===
- June 30 – July 2: 2017 Canoe Marathon European Championships in (Portugal) Ponte de Lima
  - Note: This event was supposed to be hosted in Vila Nova de Gaia, but an ICF official stated that the venue's conditions were unsatisfactory.
  - Hungary won both the gold and overall medal tallies.
- July 26–30: 2017 ICF Wildwater Canoeing Junior and U23 World Championships in (Austria) Murau-Mur
  - Nations Cup Sprint winners: France
  - Individual Sprint winners: The Czech Republic won the gold medal tally. France won the overall medal tally.
  - Team Sprint winners: France won both the gold and overall medal tallies.
  - Nations Cup Classical winners: The Czech Republic
  - Individual Classical winners: The Czech Republic won both the gold and overall medal tallies.
  - Team Classical winners: The Czech Republic won both the gold and overall medal tallies.
- August 19–25: 2017 ICF Canoe Sailing World Championships in (United Kingdom) Pwllheli (Pwllheli Sailing Club)
  - AC winner: (United Kingdom) Stephen Bowen; IC winner: (United Kingdom) Robin Wood; TAIFUN winner: (Germany) Cladius Junge
- August 23–27: 2017 ICF Paracanoe World Championships in (Czech Republic) Račice
  - Australia won the gold medal tally. Great Britain won the overall medal tally.
- August 23–27: 2017 European Canoe Polo Championship in Saint-Omer
  - Champions (Men): Spain; Second: Germany; Third: Italy
  - Champions (Women): Germany; Second: France; Third: Switzerland
  - Champions (Men's U21): Great Britain; Second: Germany; Third: Russia
  - Champions (Women's U21): Germany; Second: Poland; Third: France
- September 3–8: 2017 ICF Dragon Boat Club Crew World Championships in (Italy) Venice
  - For results, click here.
- September 7–10: 2017 ICF Canoe Marathon World Championships in (South Africa) Pietermaritzburg
  - Hungary won both the gold and overall medal tallies.
- September 27 – October 1: 2017 ICF Wildwater Canoeing World Championships in Pau
  - C1 winners: (Czech Republic) Ondrej Rolenc (m) / (France) Claire Haab (f)
  - C2 winners: France (Quentin Dazeur & Stephane Santamaria) (m) / Czech Republic (Anezka Paloudova & Marie Nemcova) (f)
  - K1 winners: (Slovenia) Anze Urankar (m) / (France) Claire Bren (f)
  - Overall Nations Cup winner: France
- November 18 & 19: 2017 ICF Ocean Racing World Championships in Hong Kong
  - Open winners: (Australia) Cory Hill (m) / (South Africa) Hayley Nixon Jo (f)
  - U23 winners: (South Africa) John Kenneth Rice (m) / (Sweden) Linnea Stensils (f)
  - U18 winners: (Australia) Oscar Jones (m) / (South Africa) Sabina Lawrie (f)
- November 27 – December 2: 2017 ICF Canoe Freestyle World Championships in San Juan, Argentina
  - SQRT winners: (United States) Clay Wright (m) / (United Kingdom) Claire O'Hara (f)
  - Senior kayak winners: (Spain) Joaquim Fontane I Maso (m) / (United Kingdom) Claire O'Hara (f)
  - Junior kayak winners: (France) Tom Dolle (m) / (United Kingdom) Ottilie Robinson-Shaw (f)
  - Men's canoe winner: (United States) Dane Jackson

== Rowing ==
=== International rowing events ===
- February 4: 2017 European Rowing Indoor Championships in (France) Paris
  - For results, click here.
- May 20 & 21: 2017 European Junior Rowing Championships in Krefeld
  - Germany won both the gold and overall medal tallies.
- May 26–28: 2017 European Rowing Championships in (Czech Republic) Račice
  - Italy and Romania won 3 gold medals each. Italy won the overall medal tally.
- July 19–23: 2017 World Rowing Under 23 Championships in (Bulgaria) Plovdiv
  - Italy won both the gold and overall medal tallies.
- September 7–10: 2017 World Rowing Masters Regatta in (Slovenia) Bled
  - For results, click here.
- September 24 – October 1: 2017 World Rowing Championships in (United States) Sarasota, Florida
  - Italy, New Zealand, and Australia won 3 gold medals each. Italy won the overall medal tally.
- October 13–15: 2017 World Rowing Coastal Championships in (France) Thonon-les-Bains
  - Italy won both the gold and overall medal tallies.

=== 2017 World Rowing Cup ===
- May 5–7: #1 in (Serbia) Belgrade
  - Great Britain won both the gold and overall medal tallies.
- June 15–18: #2 in Poznań
  - New Zealand won the gold medal tally. Poland won the overall medal tally.
- July 7–9: #3 (final) in (Switzerland) Lucerne
  - New Zealand won both the gold and overall medal tallies.

== Sailing ==
=== 2017 Sailing World Cup ===
- January 22–29: SWC #1 in (United States) Miami
  - Great Britain, France, and Brazil won 2 gold medals each. Great Britain won the overall medal tally.
- April 23–30: SWC #2 in Hyères
  - France won both the gold and overall medal tallies.
- June 4–11: SWC (#3) finals in (Spain) Santander
  - Great Britain won both the gold and overall medal tallies.

=== 2017 America's Cup ===
- May 26 – June 12: 2017 Louis Vuitton Cup in (Bermuda) Great Sound, Hamilton
  - Winners: Emirates Team New Zealand
- June 17–27: 2017 America's Cup in (Bermuda) Great Sound, Hamilton
  - Emirates Team New Zealand defeated (United States) Oracle Team USA, 7–1.
- June 20 & 21: 2017 Youth America's Cup in (Bermuda) Great Sound, Hamilton
  - Winners: (United Kingdom) Land Rover BAR Academy (50 points); Second: (New Zealand) NZL Sailing Team (48 points); Third: (Switzerland) Team Tilt (42 points)

See also: 2015–16 America's Cup World Series, to determine the starting points score of the teams taking part in the 2017 Louis Vuitton Cup.

=== International sailing events ===
- November 6, 2016 – January 19: 2016–17 Vendée Globe, starting and finishing in (France) Les Sables-d'Olonne
  - (France) Armel Le Cléac'h won in a record time of 74 days, 3 hours and 35 minutes
- June 29 – July 9: 2017 Star World Championships in (Denmark) Troense Bådelaug, Tåsinge
  - Winners: Norway (Eivind Melleby & Joshua Revkin) (Royal Norwegian Yacht Club)
- July 7–15: 2017 2017 470 World Championships in (Greece) Thessaloniki
  - Winners: Australia (Mathew Belcher & William Ryan) (m) / Poland (Agnieszka Skrzypulec & Irmina Gliszczyńska) (f)
- July 30 – August 5: 2017 Youth Match Racing World Championships at the Balboa Yacht Club in (United States) Corona del Mar, Newport Beach
  - (Australia) Team Harry Price defeated (Italy) Team Ettore Botticini, with the score of 3–2 in the final.
- September 5–10: 2017 2017 Nacra 17 World Championship in (France) La Grande-Motte
  - (United Kingdom) Ben Saxton & Katie Dabson defeated (Spain) Fernando Echavarri & Tara Pacheco, with the score of 92–95 in the final.
- September 16–23: 2017 RS:X World Championships in (Japan) Enoshima
  - Individual winners: (China) YE Bing (m) / (China) Chen Peina (f)
  - U21 winners: (Spain) Angel Granda Roque (m) / (Russia) Stefania Elfutina (f)
- December 9–16: 2017 ISAF Youth Sailing World Championships in (China) Sanya
  - Note: This event was to be hosted in Akko, but it withdrew because of funding problems.
  - The United States and Israel won 2 gold medals each. Italy won the overall medal tally.
  - Nations Trophy winners: Italy

== Surfing ==
=== World surfing championships ===
- May 20–28: 2017 ISA World Surfing Games in Biarritz
  - Men's Open winners: First: (Mexico) Jhony Corzo; Second: (France) Joan Duru; Third: (Portugal) Pedro Henrique; Fourth: (Spain) Jonathan González
  - Women's Open winners: First: (France) Pauline Ado; Second: (France) Johanne Defay; Third: (Costa Rica) Leilani McGonagle; Fourth: (South Africa) Bianca Buitendag
  - Team winners: First: France (4,275 points); Second: Portugal (2,850 points); Third: Spain (2,560 points); Fourth: Mexico (2,455 points)
  - Aloha Cup winners: First: France; Second: Portugal; Third: Peru; Fourth: The United States
- September 1–10: 2017 ISA World StandUp Paddle and Paddleboard Championship in (Denmark) Vorupør and Copenhagen
  - SUP Surfing winners: (Brazil) Luiz Diniz (m) / (Australia) Shakira Westdorp (f)
  - Sprint winners: (Denmark) Casper Steinfath (m) / (Slovenia) Manca Notar (f)
  - SUP Distance Racing winners: (Hungary) Bruno Hasulyo (m) / (New Zealand) Annabel Anderson (f)
  - Paddle Distance Racing winners: (Australia) Lachie Landsdown (m) / (Australia) Jordan Mercer (f)
  - SUP Technical winners: (United States) Mo Freitas (m) / (New Zealand) Annabel Anderson (f)
  - Paddle Technical winners: (Australia) Lachie Landsdown (m) / (Australia) Jordan Mercer (f)
  - Overall Team Points -> Champions: Australia; Second: France; Third: New Zealand
- September 23 – October 1: 2017 ISA World Junior Surfing Championship in Hyūga, Miyazaki
  - U18 winners: (Argentina) Ignacio Gundesen (m) / (Hawaii) Brisa Hennessy (f)
  - U16 winners: (Japan) Joh Azuchi (m) / (United States) Alyssa Spencer (f)
  - Aloha Cup -> Champions: Japan; Second: Hawaii; Third: France; Fourth: Costa Rica
  - Team Points -> Champions: United States; Second: Hawaii; Third: Japan
- September 30 – October 8: 2017 ISA Kneeboard World Championship in Cantabria
  - Australia won both the gold and overall medal tallies.
  - Aloha Cup Champions: Australia; Second: United States; Third: Spain; Fourth: France
- November 30 – December 3: 2017 ISA World Adaptive Surfing Championship in La Jolla
  - Champions: Brazil; Second: Australia; Third: United States; Fourth: Chile

=== 2017 World Surf League (WSL) Men's Championship Tour ===
- Overall winner: (Hawaii) John John Florence

=== 2017 World Surf League (WSL) Women's Championship Tour ===
- Overall winner: (Australia) Tyler Wright

== Water polo ==
=== 2017 FINA Men's Water Polo World League ===
- November 15, 2016 – April 11, 2017: 2016–17 FINA Men's European Water Polo Preliminary Rounds
  - Qualified teams to the Superfinal: Croatia, Italy, Russia, and Serbia
- April 25–30: 2017 FINA Men's Intercontinental Water Polo Tournament in Gold Coast, Queensland
  - Qualified teams to the Superfinal: Australia, United States, Japan, and Kazakhstan
- June 20–25: 2017 FINA Men's Water Polo World League Superfinal in (Russia) Ruza
  - Serbia defeated Italy, 10–9, to win their fifth consecutive and 11th overall FINA Men's Water Polo World League title.
  - Croatia took the bronze medal.

=== 2017 FINA Women's Water Polo World League ===
- November 29, 2016 – April 18, 2017: 2016–17 FINA Women's European Preliminary Rounds
  - Qualified teams to the Superfinal: Russia, Netherlands, and Hungary.
- May 2–7: 2017 FINA Women's Intercontinental Water Polo Tournament in Sacramento, California
  - Qualified teams to the Superfinal: United States, Australia, Japan, Canada, and China
- June 6–11: 2017 FINA Women's Water Polo League Superfinal in (China) Shanghai
  - The United States defeated Canada, 12–6, to win their fourth consecutive and 11th overall FINA Women's Water Polo League title.
  - Russia took third place.

=== Water polo world championships ===
- August 5–13: 2017 FINA Junior Water Polo World Championships in Belgrade
  - Greece defeated Croatia, 12–10 in a shootout and after a 7–7 score in regular play, to win their second FINA Junior Water Polo World Championships title.
  - Serbia took the bronze medal.
- September 3–9: 2017 FINA World Women's Junior Water Polo Championships in Volos
  - Russia defeated Greece, 8–7 in penalties and after a 9–9 score in regular play, to win their second FINA World Women's Junior Water Polo Championships title.
  - The Netherlands took the bronze medal.

=== Ligue Européenne de Natation ===
- September 30, 2016 – May 27, 2017: 2016–17 LEN Champions League (final six in (Hungary) Budapest)
  - (Hungary) Szolnok defeated (Croatia) VK Jug, 10–5, to win their first LEN Champions League title.
  - (Italy) Pro Recco took third place.
- December 1, 2016 – April 29, 2017: LEN Euro League Women
  - (Russia) Kinef Kirishi defeated (Greece) Olympiacos, 7–6, to win their first LEN Euro League Women title.
  - (Spain) CN Sabadell took third place.
- October 14, 2016 – April 5, 2017: 2016–17 LEN Euro Cup
  - (Hungary) Ferencvárosi TC defeated (Romania) CSM Digi Oradea, 19–13 on aggregate, to win their first LEN Euro Cup title.
- August 20–27: 2017 European Junior Women's Water Polo Championship in (Serbia) Novi Sad
  - Spain defeated the Netherlands, 11–10, in the final. Hungary took third place.
- September 10–17: 2017 European Junior Men's Water Polo Championship in Malta
  - Montenegro defeated Spain, 11–10, in the final. Hungary took third place.

== Water skiing & wakeboarding ==
- January 5–8: 2017 World Junior Water Ski Championships in (Chile) Santiago
  - Slalom winners: (United Kingdom) Robert Hazelwood (m) / (Canada) Jaimee Bull (f)
  - Tricks winners: (Mexico) Patricio Font (m) / (United States) Anna Gay (f)
  - Jump winners: (Canada) Conley Pinette (m) / (Canada) Dominique Grondin-Allard (f)
  - Overall winners: (United Kingdom) Joel Poland (m) / (United States) Brooke Baldwin (f)
- January 30 – February 5: 2017 Asia Oceania Waterski & Wakeboard Championships in (New Zealand) Auckland
  - Slalom winners: (Australia) Nicholas Adams (m) / (New Zealand) Hilary Munro (f)
  - Tricks winners: (Australia) Archie Davis (m) / (Malaysia) Aaliyah Yoong-Hanifah (f)
  - Jump winners: (New Zealand) Lance Green (m) / (Japan) Saaya Hirosawa (f)
  - Overall winners: (Australia) Archie Davis (m) / (Australia) Katelyn Miller (f)
  - Wakeboard winners: (Australia) Tony Iacconi (m) / (South Korea) Yun Hee-hyun (f)
- April 24–30: 2017 World Disabled Waterski Championships in (Australia) Myuna Bay
  - Men's Standing overall winner: (United States) Craig Timm
  - Seated Overall winners: (Australia) Derek Vanderbom (m) / (France) Delphine Le Sausse (f)
  - Vision Impaired Overall winners: (Italy) Daniele Cassioli (m) / (United States) Kate Mawby (f)
- July 13–16: 2017 World Under 21 Waterski Championships in (Ukraine) Dnipro
  - Slalom winners: (United States) Taylor Garcia (m) / (United States) Allie Nicholson (f)
  - Tricks winners: (Ukraine) Danylo Fil'Chenko (m) / (United States) Anna Gay (f)
  - Jump winners: (United Kingdom) Jack Critchley (m) / (Canada) Dominique Grondin-Allard (f)
  - Overall winners: (Ukraine) Danylo Fil'Chenko (m) / (United States) Anna Gay (f)
  - Team winners: Canada
- July 26 – August 6: 2017 World Waterski Racing Championships in (United States) Seattle
  - Open winners: (Australia) Ben Gulley (m) / (Australia) Chelsea Blight (f)
  - F2 winners: (Australia) Cameron Osborne (m) / (Australia) Ellen Jones (f)
  - Junior winners: (Australia) Luke Harrison (m) / (Australia) Milana Long (f)
- September 3–10: 2017 Water Ski World Championships in (France) Paris
  - Jump winners: (Canada) Ryan Dodd (m) / (Australia) Jacinta Carroll (f)
  - Slalom winners: (United Kingdom) Frederick Winter (m) / (United States) Regina Jaquess (f)
  - Tricks winners: (United States) Adam Pickos (m) / (Canada) Neilly Ross (f)
  - Overall winners: (Chile) Felipe Miranda (m) / (United States) Regina Jaquess (f)
