= Red Bull Cliff Diving World Series =

Annual international series of cliff diving events

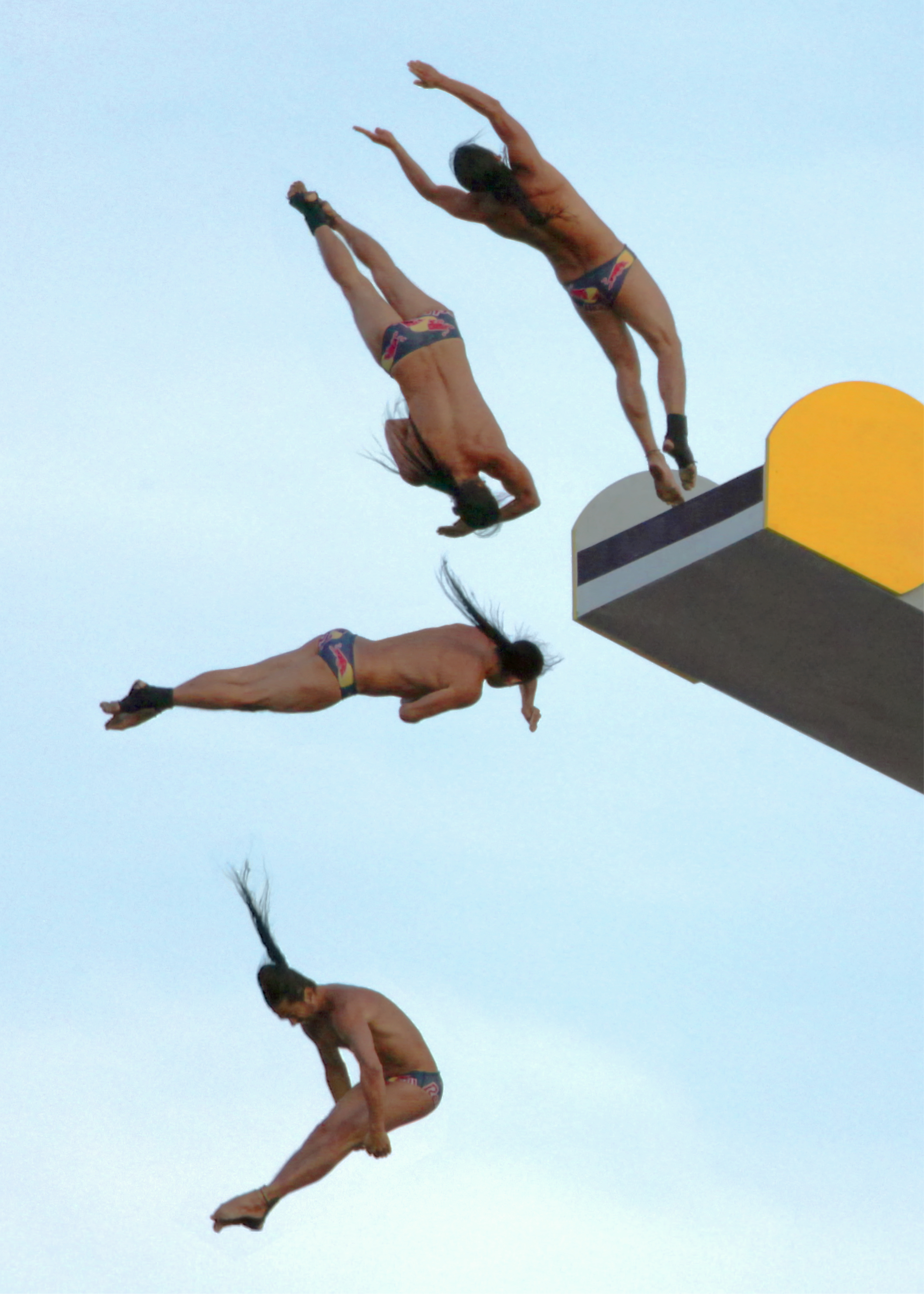
A composite dive from Orlando Duque.

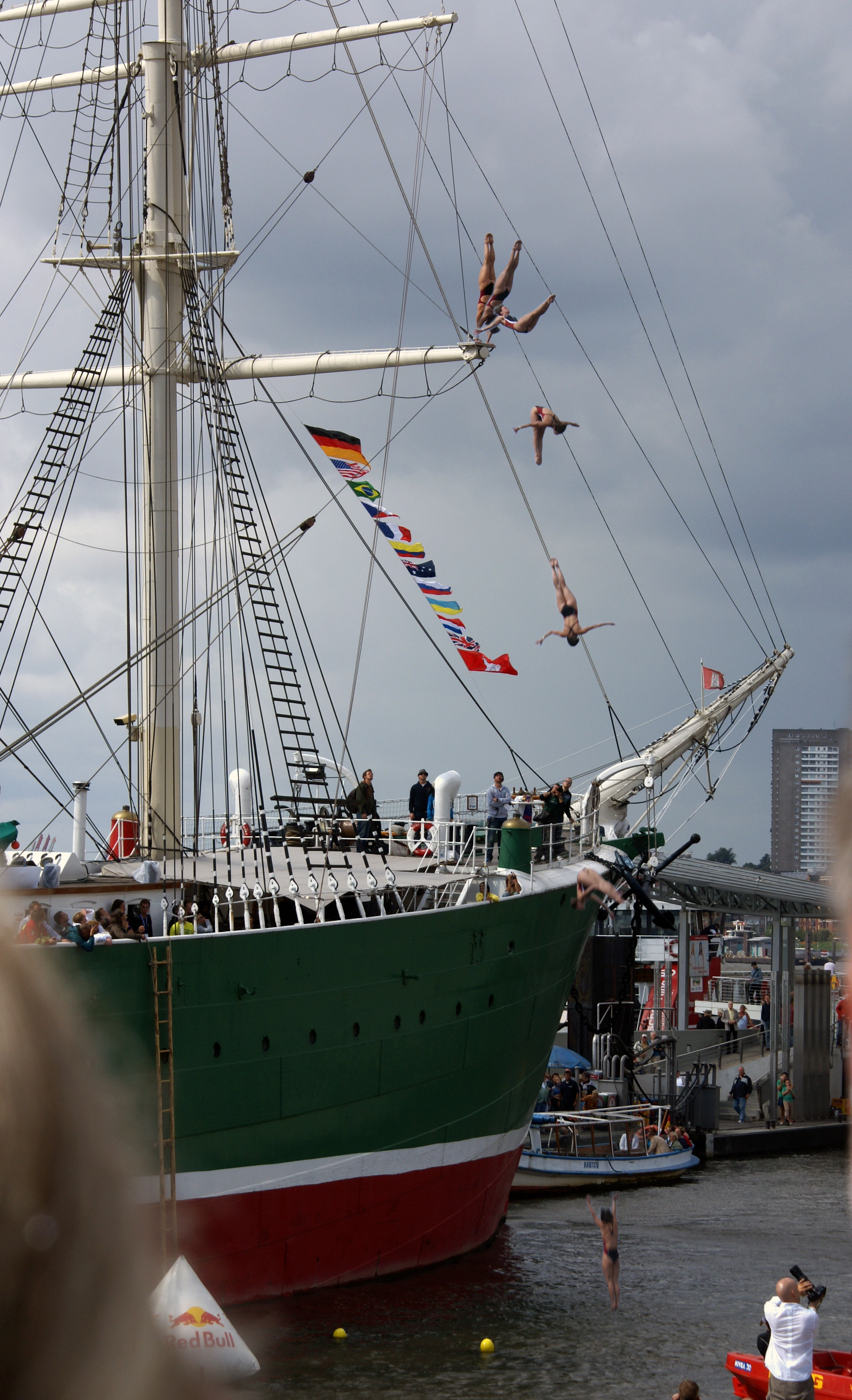
Red Bull Cliff Diving Hamburg 2009

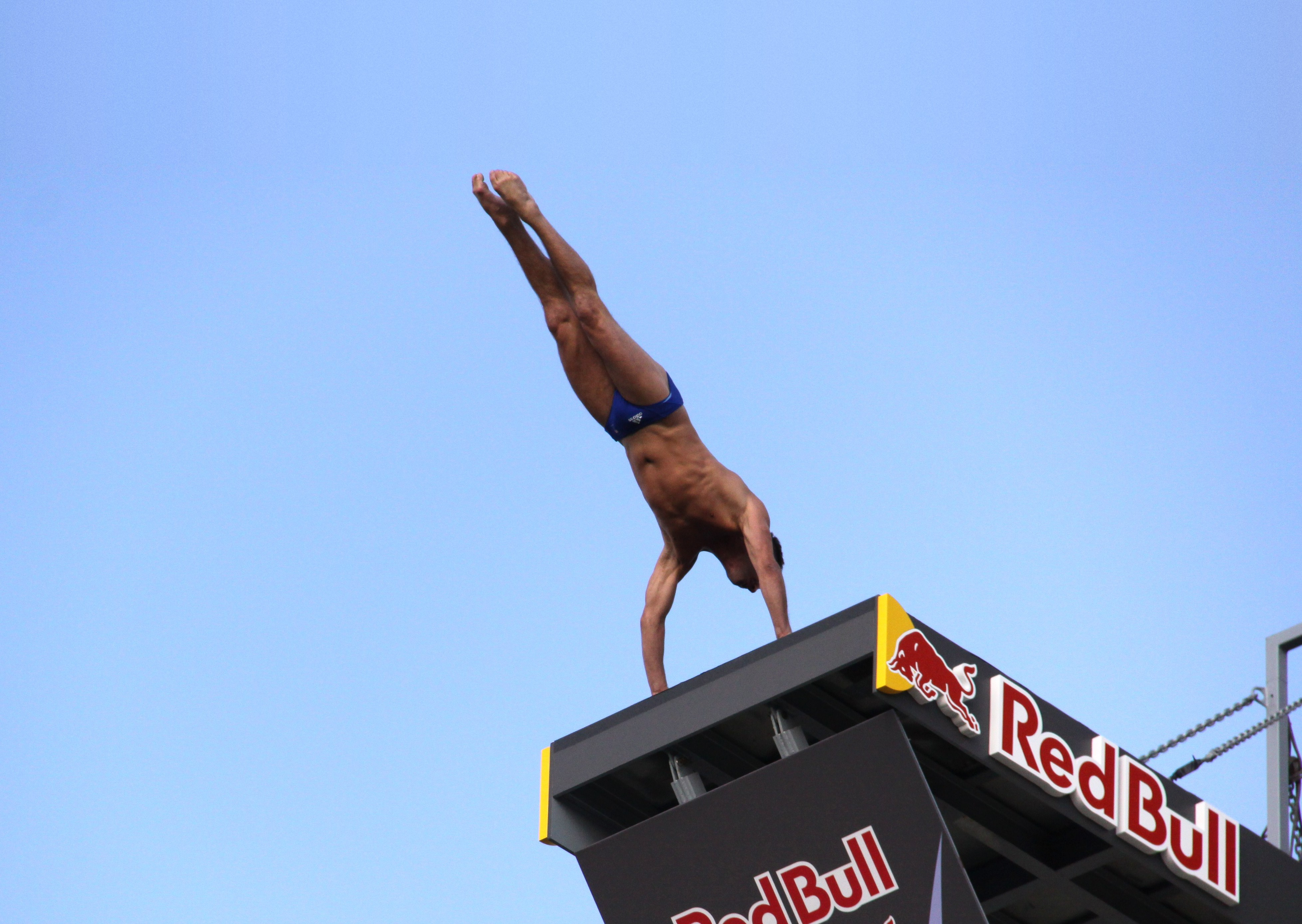
Red Bull Cliff Diving World Series 2011 in La Rochelle, France.

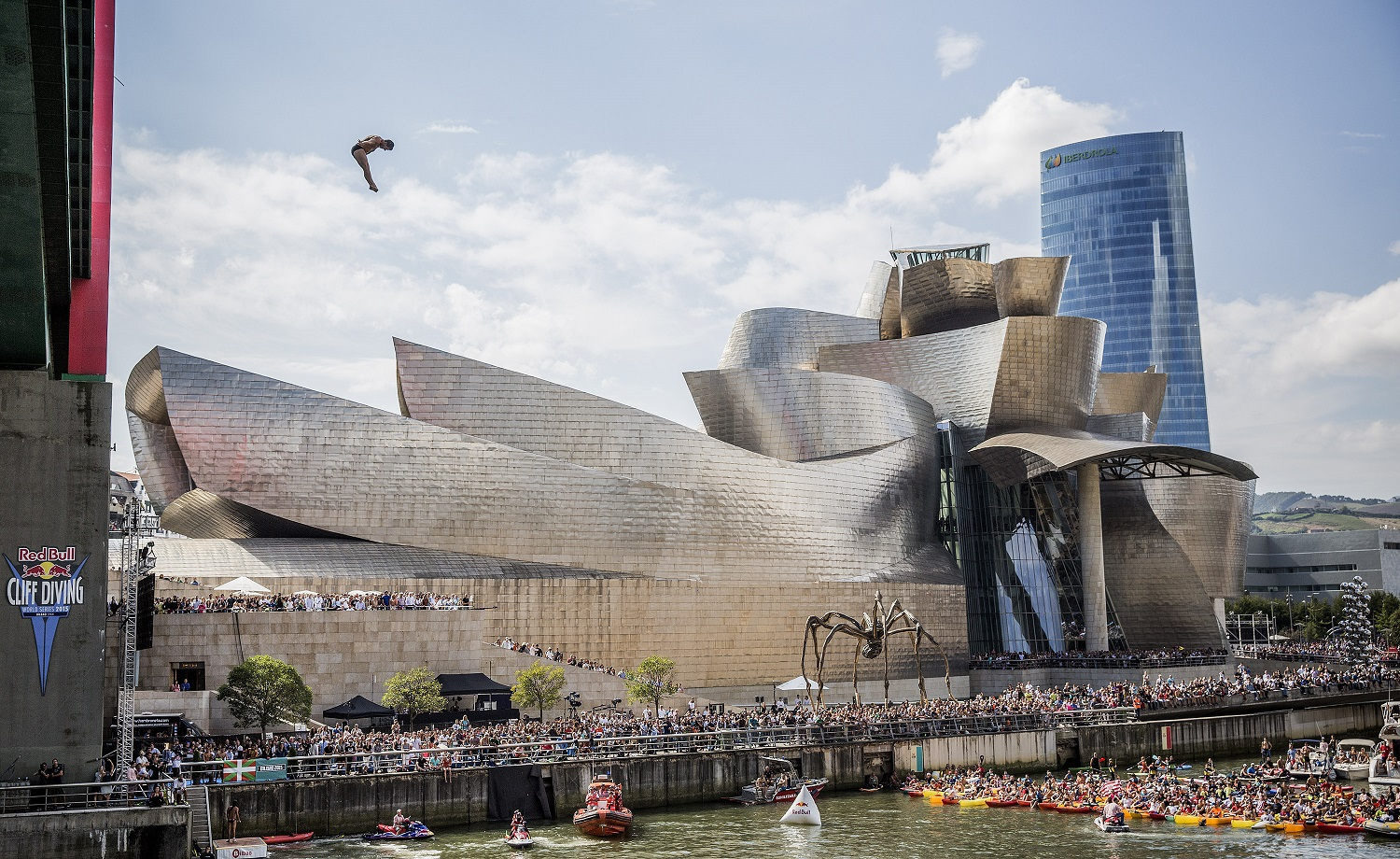
A person dives from the 27.5 meter platform on La Salve bridge.

The Red Bull Cliff Diving World Series, established in 2009 by Red Bull, is an annual international circuit of high diving competitions. Widely regarded as the premier global championship in cliff and high diving, the series features elite athletes performing complex acrobatic maneuvers from extreme heights into open water bodies across natural and urban settings worldwide.

Competitors dive from specially constructed platforms mounted on coastal cliffs, historic bridges, and architectural landmarks. Male divers launch from a platform height of 27 metres (89 ft), while female divers compete from 21 metres (69 ft). Athletes reach speeds of approximately 85 km/h (53 mph) in under three seconds before entering the water feet-first, decelerating to a complete stop within four metres and enduring impact forces up to nine times the force of gravity.

At each tour stop, a fixed roster of permanent athletes is joined by wildcard entrants. Individual competition results contribute to the cumulative season standings. At the conclusion of the season, the top-ranked male and female divers are awarded the King Kahekili Trophy, named in honour of 18th-century Hawaiian king Kahekili II, widely regarded as the historical pioneer of the ancient cliff-diving discipline known as lele kawa.

The series has played a fundamental role in standardizing and popularizing high diving as an internationally recognized aquatic discipline, leading to its formal inclusion in the World Aquatics Championships by World Aquatics (formerly FINA) in 2013. The most successful athletes in series history are eleven-time men's champion Gary Hunt and ten-time women's champion Rhiannan Iffland.

== History ==
=== Origins and early seasons (2008–2013) ===
High diving traces its historical roots to the Hawaiian island of Lanai, where 18th-century chieftain Kahekili II required his warriors to leap from towering ocean cliffs to demonstrate courage and military prowess in an ancient tradition called lele kawa (diving feet-first into water without making a splash). In July 2008, Red Bull staged a precursor international cliff diving invitational at Polignano a Mare, Italy, which laid the operational groundwork for a structured global tour.

The inaugural Red Bull Cliff Diving World Series officially launched in 2009 as an eight-event men's championship, beginning on 8 May at La Rochelle, France, before 40,000 spectators. Veteran Colombian cliff diver Orlando Duque captured the inaugural men's title after an intense season-long duel with British diver Gary Hunt. Hunt secured his first championship the following year in 2010, inaugurating an era of tour dominance driven by unprecedented degrees of difficulty—including the front 4½ somersaults and triple-quad twisting combinations. Hunt retained the title in 2011 and 2012, before Russian diver Artem Silchenko clinched the 2013 crown at the season finale in the Phi Phi Islands, Thailand.

The competitive credibility and strict safety protocols developed by the World Series contributed directly to World Aquatics (then FINA) officially recognizing high diving as a medal sport at the 2013 World Aquatics Championships in Barcelona, where Duque won the inaugural world title and Hunt earned silver.

=== Introduction of Women's Series and tour expansion (2014–2019) ===
In 2014, the tour officially inaugurated the Women's World Series, competing from 20-metre (66 ft) platforms alongside the men's tour. American diver Rachelle Simpson won the maiden women's title in 2014 and defended it in 2015, while Hunt claimed his fourth and fifth men's trophies in dominant fashion.

The 2016 season marked a turning point with the emergence of Australian Rhiannan Iffland, who entered the tour opener at Possum Kingdom Lake, Texas, as an unheralded wildcard and won in her debut appearance. Iffland claimed the 2016 championship and launched the most dominant individual streak in the sport's history, winning seven consecutive World Series titles (2016–2023) and completing undefeated seasons in both 2019 and 2021.

The men's competition saw fierce battles throughout the late 2010s: Mexico's Jonathan Paredes edged Hunt for the 2017 title with consistent execution, while American Steven LoBue pushed Hunt to the final dive in 2018 before Hunt captured his sixth and seventh championships in 2018 and 2019.

=== Gender equality, post-pandemic restart, and new generation (2020–present) ===
The 2020 World Series was entirely cancelled due to the COVID-19 pandemic. When the circuit resumed in 2021, Red Bull enacted structural reforms guaranteeing complete gender equality across all aspects of the tour: both divisions adopted identical 12-diver rosters (eight permanent divers and four wildcards per stop), equal platform requirements (with women's height formalized at 21 metres), identical championship scoring scales, and equal prize money.

The post-pandemic era saw the rise of a new generation challenging the sport's established legends. In the men's division, Romanian Olympians Constantin Popovici and Cătălin Preda, alongside British prodigy Aidan Heslop, challenged Gary Hunt (who began representing France in 2021). Hunt secured consecutive titles in 2021 and 2022, before Popovici clinched his maiden world championship in 2023. Heslop became the youngest men's champion in history by winning the 2024 title at age 22. In 2025, Hunt reclaimed the throne to capture his record eleventh world championship, before Heslop secured his second world title in 2026. In the women's series, Canadian Molly Carlson and wildcard Kaylea Arnett emerged as prominent contenders, but Iffland maintained her supremacy, extending her record total to ten world championships through 2026.

== Points systems ==
Every athlete scores championship points at each event based on their final ranking. The overall Cliff Diving World Series champion is the diver who accumulates the highest total number of points across all competitions during the season.

The championship scoring system has evolved over four main eras:

Period	1st	2nd	3rd	4th	5th	6th	7th	8th	9th	10th	11th	12th	13th	14th	Best Dive Bonus
2009–2011	20	16	13	11	9	7	6	5	4	3	2	1	—	—	—
2012–2019 (Note: In 2012, points were multiplied by 10 and the men's field expanded to 14 divers (10 permanent + 4 wildcards). The women's series (introduced in 2014) used the same point scale truncated at the 8th or 10th position depending on field size.)	200	160	130	110	90	70	60	50	40	30	20	10	9	8	—
2021–2022 (Note: Following the COVID-19 pandemic, the tour introduced equal 12-diver fields (8 permanent + 4 wildcards) for both men and women, discontinuing points for 13th and 14th place.)	200	160	130	110	92	76	62	50	39	29	20	12	—	—	—
2023	200	160	130	110	92	76	62	50	39	29	20	12	—	—	+10
2024–present	20	16	13	10	8	7	6	5	4	3	2	1	—	—	+1

The top divers in the overall standings at the end of the season pre-qualify automatically as permanent divers for the following season.

== Results by year ==
=== Men ===
Season	Champion	Second	Third
2026	(United Kingdom) Aidan Heslop - 78 pts	(United States) James Lichtenstein - 73 pts	(Romania) Constantin Popovici - 68 pts
2025	(France) Gary Hunt - 54 pts	(Romania) Constantin Popovici - 48 pts	(Spain) Carlos Gimeno - 46 pts
2024	(United Kingdom) Aidan Heslop - 121 pts	(Romania) Constantin Popovici - 107 pts	(United States) James Lichtenstein - 101 pts
2023	(Romania) Constantin Popovici - 1032 pts	(United Kingdom) Aidan Heslop - 809 pts	(Spain) Carlos Gimeno - 703 pts
2022	(France) Gary Hunt - 1240 pts	(United Kingdom) Aidan Heslop - 1166 pts	(Romania) Cătălin Preda - 1130 pts
2021	(France) Gary Hunt – 800 pts	(Romania) Constantin Popovici – 640 pts	(Romania) Cătălin Preda – 550 pts
2020	Series cancelled due to the COVID-19 pandemic.		
2019	(United Kingdom) Gary Hunt – 1160 pts	(Mexico) Jonathan Paredes – 750 pts	(United States) Andy Jones – 500 pts
2018	(United Kingdom) Gary Hunt – 1010 pts	(United States) Steven LoBue – 950 pts	(Mexico) Jonathan Paredes – 790 pts
2017	(Mexico) Jonathan Paredes – 720 pts	(United Kingdom) Gary Hunt – 710 pts	(United Kingdom) Blake Aldridge – 580 pts
2016	(United Kingdom) Gary Hunt – 1350 pts	(Mexico) Jonathan Paredes – 1030 pts	(United States) Andy Jones – 910 pts
2015	(United Kingdom) Gary Hunt – 1320 pts	(Colombia) Orlando Duque – 970 pts	(Mexico) Jonathan Paredes – 849 pts
2014	(United Kingdom) Gary Hunt – 1110 pts	(Russia) Artem Silchenko – 840 pts	(United States) Steven LoBue – 680 pts
2013	(Russia) Artem Silchenko – 1030 pts	(United Kingdom) Gary Hunt – 980 pts	(Colombia) Orlando Duque – 860 pts
2012	(United Kingdom) Gary Hunt – 860 pts	(Colombia) Orlando Duque – 840 pts	(United States) Steven LoBue – 740 pts
2011	(United Kingdom) Gary Hunt – 125 pts	(Russia) Artem Silchenko – 90 pts	(Czech Republic) Michal Navrátil – 74 pts
2010	(United Kingdom) Gary Hunt – 109 pts	(Colombia) Orlando Duque – 94 pts	(Russia) Artem Silchenko – 80 pts
2009	(Colombia) Orlando Duque – 127 pts	(United Kingdom) Gary Hunt – 127 pts	(Russia) Artem Silchenko – 111 pts

=== Women ===
Season	Champion	Second	Third
2026	(Australia) Rhiannan Iffland – 78 pts	(Canada) Molly Carlson – 71 pts	(Canada) Simone Leathead – 52 pts
2025	(Australia) Rhiannan Iffland – 83 pts	(Canada) Simone Leathead – 42 pts	(United States) Kaylea Arnett – 38 pts
2024	(Australia) Rhiannan Iffland – 157 pts	(Canada) Molly Carlson – 112 pts	(Canada) Simone Leathead – 68 pts
2023	(Australia) Rhiannan Iffland – 1200 pts	(Canada) Molly Carlson – 970 pts	(Australia) Xantheia Pennisi – 600 pts
2022	(Australia) Rhiannan Iffland – 1560 pts	(Canada) Molly Carlson – 1270 pts	(United States) Eleanor Smart – 820 pts
2021	(Australia) Rhiannan Iffland – 800 pts	(Canada) Jessica Macaulay – 580 pts	(Canada) Molly Carlson – 560 pts
2020	Series cancelled due to the COVID-19 pandemic.		
2019	(Australia) Rhiannan Iffland – 1200 pts	(United Kingdom) Jessica Macaulay – 670 pts	(Canada) Lysanne Richard – 660 pts
2018	(Australia) Rhiannan Iffland – 830 pts	(Mexico) Adriana Jiménez – 760 pts	(Canada) Lysanne Richard – 690 pts
2017	(Australia) Rhiannan Iffland – 890 pts	(Australia) Helena Merten – 740 pts	(Mexico) Adriana Jiménez – 690 pts
2016	(Australia) Rhiannan Iffland – 1290 pts	(Canada) Lysanne Richard – 1030 pts	(United States) Cesilie Carlton – 780 pts
2015	(United States) Rachelle Simpson – 490 pts	(United States) Ginger Huber – 420 pts	(United States) Cesilie Carlton – 400 pts
2014	(United States) Rachelle Simpson – 600 pts	(Germany) Anna Bader – 390 pts	(Mexico) Adriana Jiménez – 360 pts

== Tour events ==
Year	Stop 1	Stop 2	Stop 3	Stop 4	Stop 5	Stop 6	Stop 7	Stop 8	Stop 9
2009	(France) FRA; La Rochelle	(Netherlands) NED; Rotterdam	(Croatia) CRO; Dubrovnik	(Italy) ITA; Polignano a Mare	(Turkey) TUR; Antalya	(Germany) GER; Hamburg	(Switzerland) SUI; Sisikon	(Greece) GRE; Athens	—
2010	(France) FRA; La Rochelle	(Mexico) MEX; Ik Kil	(Norway) NOR; Kragerø	(Italy) ITA; Polignano a Mare	(Switzerland) SUI; Sisikon	(United States) USA; Hilo	—	—	—
2011	(Chile) CHI; Rapa Nui	(Mexico) MEX; Ik Kil	(Greece) GRE; Athens	(France) FRA; La Rochelle	(Italy) ITA; Malcesine	(United States) USA; Boston	(Ukraine) UKR; Yalta	—	—
2012	(France) FRA; Bonifacio	(Norway) NOR; Grimstad	(Portugal) POR; Azores	(Republic of Ireland) IRL; Inis Mór	(United States) USA; Boston	(United Kingdom) GBR; Abereiddy	(Oman) OMA; Wadi Shab	—	—
2013	(France) FRA; La Rochelle	(Denmark) DEN; Copenhagen	(Portugal) POR; Azores	(Italy) ITA; Malcesine	(United States) USA; Boston	(United Kingdom) GBR; Pembrokeshire	(Brazil) BRA; Niterói	(Thailand) THA; Krabi	—
2014 (Note: No qualification stop was held in 2014; up to four wildcards joined 10 permanent divers at each stop.)	(Cuba) CUB; Havana	(United States) USA; Possum Kingdom Lake	(Republic of Ireland) IRL; Inis Mór	(Norway) NOR; Kragerø	(Portugal) POR; Azores	(Spain) ESP; Bilbao	(Mexico) MEX; Ik Kil	—	—
2015	(Colombia) COL; Cartagena	(France) FRA; La Rochelle	(United States) USA; Possum Kingdom Lake	(Denmark) DEN; Copenhagen	(Portugal) POR; Azores	(Bosnia and Herzegovina) BIH; Mostar	(Italy) ITA; Polignano a Mare	(Spain) ESP; Bilbao	—
2016	(United States) USA; Possum Kingdom Lake	(Denmark) DEN; Copenhagen	(Portugal) POR; Azores	(France) FRA; La Rochelle	(Italy) ITA; Polignano a Mare	(United Kingdom) GBR; Pembrokeshire	(Bosnia and Herzegovina) BIH; Mostar	(Japan) JPN; Shirahama	(United Arab Emirates) UAE; Dubai
2017	(Republic of Ireland) IRL; Inis Mór	(Portugal) POR; Azores	(Italy) ITA; Polignano a Mare	(United States) USA; Possum Kingdom Lake	(Bosnia and Herzegovina) BIH; Mostar	(Chile) CHI; Lago Ranco	—	—	—
2018	(United States) USA; Possum Kingdom Lake	(Spain) ESP; Bilbao	(Portugal) POR; Azores	(Switzerland) SUI; Sisikon	(Denmark) DEN; Copenhagen	(Bosnia and Herzegovina) BIH; Mostar	(Italy) ITA; Polignano a Mare	—	—
2019	(Philippines) PHI; El Nido	(Republic of Ireland) IRL; Dublin	(Italy) ITA; Polignano a Mare	(Portugal) POR; Azores	(Lebanon) LBN; Beirut	(Bosnia and Herzegovina) BIH; Mostar	(Spain) ESP; Bilbao	—	—
2020	Series cancelled due to the COVID-19 pandemic.								
2021	(France) FRA; Saint-Raphaël	(Norway) NOR; Oslo	(Bosnia and Herzegovina) BIH; Mostar	(Republic of Ireland) IRL; Downpatrick Head	(Italy) ITA; Apulia (Note: The event was held in Polignano a Mare, but was officially branded as "Apulia" to differentiate it from the season finale held at the same location a few days later.)	(Italy) ITA; Polignano a Mare (Note: Replaced the cancelled Baku (Azerbaijan) stop as the season finale.)	—	—	—
2022	(United States) USA; Boston	(France) FRA; Paris	(Denmark) DEN; Copenhagen	(Norway) NOR; Oslo	(Bosnia and Herzegovina) BIH; Mostar	(Switzerland) SUI; Sisikon	(Italy) ITA; Polignano a Mare	(Australia) AUS; Sydney	—
2023	(United States) USA; Boston	(France) FRA; Paris	(Italy) ITA; Polignano a Mare	(Japan) JPN; Takachiho	(Bosnia and Herzegovina) BIH; Mostar	(New Zealand) NZL; Auckland (Note: Postponed from late 2023 and held on 28 January 2024 as the 2023 season finale.)	—	—	—
2024	(Greece) GRE; Athens	(United States) USA; Boston	(Italy) ITA; Polignano a Mare	(United Kingdom) GBR; Causeway Coast	(Norway) NOR; Oslo	(Canada) CAN; Montreal	(Turkey) TUR; Antalya	(Australia) AUS; Sydney	—
2025	(Philippines) PHI; El Nido	(Italy) ITA; Polignano a Mare	(Bosnia and Herzegovina) BIH; Mostar	(United States) USA; Boston	—	—	—	—	—
2026	(Indonesia) INA; Bali	(United States) USA; St. Petersburg	(Denmark) DEN; Copenhagen	(Bosnia and Herzegovina) BIH; Mostar	(Italy) ITA; Polignano a Mare	—	—	—	—

=== Most frequent host locations ===
Location	Country	Events	Years hosted
Polignano a Mare	Italy	14	2009, 2010, 2015, 2016, 2017, 2018, 2019, 2021 (×2) (Note: Includes the 2021 "Apulia" event, which took place in Polignano a Mare but was officially branded as "Apulia" to differentiate it from the season finale held at the same venue that week.), 2022, 2023, 2024, 2025, 2026
Mostar	Bosnia and Herzegovina	10	2015, 2016, 2017, 2018, 2019, 2021, 2022, 2023, 2025, 2026
Azores	Portugal	8	2012, 2013, 2014, 2015, 2016, 2017, 2018, 2019
Boston	United States	7	2011, 2012, 2013, 2022, 2023, 2024, 2025
Copenhagen	Denmark	6	2013, 2015, 2016, 2018, 2022, 2026
La Rochelle	France	6	2009, 2010, 2011, 2013, 2015, 2016
Possum Kingdom Lake	United States	5	2014, 2015, 2016, 2017, 2018
Bilbao	Spain	4	2014, 2015, 2018, 2019
Sisikon	Switzerland	4	2009, 2010, 2018, 2022
Athens	Greece	3	2009, 2011, 2024
Ik Kil	Mexico	3	2010, 2011, 2014
Inis Mór	Republic of Ireland	3	2012, 2014, 2017
Oslo	Norway	3	2021, 2022, 2024
Antalya	Turkey	2	2009, 2024
Malcesine	Italy	2	2011, 2013
El Nido	Philippines	2	2019, 2025
Kragerø	Norway	2	2010, 2014
Paris	France	2	2022, 2023
Pembrokeshire	United Kingdom	2	2013, 2016
Sydney	Australia	2	2022, 2024

== Competition rules ==
- Men perform 4 dives from a height ranging from 85–92 ft (26–28m). There are a total of nine groups (front, back, reverse, inward, front twists, back twists, reverse twists, inward twists and all armstand dives).
- The two required dives must be performed from different take-off positions. There are 5 take-off positions (front, back, reverse, inward and armstand). The degree of difficulty for each required dive is 3.6. To clarify: front double half twist and front double 1½ twist are different groups, but the same take-off position. If a dive has less degree of difficulty, it will still be 3.6.
- The two optional dives must be from different groups from the nine groups mentioned above. In addition, the optional dives must be done in alternating order every competition.
- A list of dives for each diver shall consist of two required dives of a fixed degree of difficulty for every athlete (3.6), and two optional dives assigned a degree of difficulty computed from the 2010 HDA table.
- The first required dive will be done after a short warm-up on the second training day. This is already part of the competition and will count 100 percent towards the total score. After this first round of dives, training can resume. The next day will have a short warm-up period followed by 2 dives (one required, one optional dive) in head-to-head format.
- The final dive will be done by the top 8 divers (winners head-to-head plus one lucky loser) in reverse order according to their cumulative score from the first 3 dives.
- Balks will receive a 2-point deduction from each judge for the first balk. Another 2-point deduction for the second balk and be considered a failed dive on the third balk. A balk is considered an interruption in movement after the diver does their press immediately before the dive. For armstand dives it is the point when both feet leave the platform (use FINA definitions).
- Running take-offs on forward dive groups (including twists) are allowed, given there is enough space for the approach.
- If the diver enters the water with their hands up on a feet-first entry, they can only get a maximum score of 5 points from each judge. The 5 points would mean a perfect execution of the entire dive with the exception of the arms. If arms are at or below shoulder height but not in alignment with the body (straight arms either in front or on the side of the body), judges can deduct between ½ to 2 points at their discretion according to the degree of the mistake.
- A break in position at or just before entry can have a deduction of ½ to 2 points at the judges' discretion. An intermediate break of position can receive no more than 4.5 points from each judge. If a dive is done in a completely different position than announced: for example back triple tuck instead of back triple pike, the dive can only receive a maximum of 2 points.
- All dives submitted in a list must consist of at least 180 degrees of rotation around a horizontal axis.

== Scoring ==
- Five judges score each dive based on a scale of 0 to 10 in half-point increments.
- Each judge scores the dives without assistance.
- The highest and the lowest judges’ scores will be discarded. The remaining three scores are added and multiplied by the degree of difficulty for that dive.
- This will produce the total score for each dive. The total score of all dives performed are added together to produce the overall total for the competition for each diver.
- Balks will constitute a deduction from each judge's score as directed by the Head Judge. The dive will be scored as usual and the announcer will deduct two points from each judge's score.

== See also ==
- 2014 FINA High Diving World Cup
- La Quebrada Cliff Divers
- List of World Aquatics Championships medalists in high diving
- Tombstoning
