= High diving at the 2013 World Aquatics Championships – Men =

Men at the High diving at the 2013 World Aquatics Championships
- Dates: 29–31 July
- Competitors: 13 from 9 nations
- Winning points: 590.20

Medalists
gold medal	Orlando Duque	Colombia
silver medal	Gary Hunt	Great Britain
bronze medal	Jonathan Paredes	Mexico

The men's competition of the high diving events at the 2013 World Aquatics Championships was held on 29 and 31 July 2013. The competition was divided into five rounds with jumps of 27m.

== Results ==
The first two rounds were held on July 29 at 16:00 and the final three rounds on July 31 at 16:00.

Rank	Diver	Nationality	Round 1	Round 2	Round 3	Round 4	Round 5	Total
1st place, gold medalist(s)	Orlando Duque	Colombia	106.40	110.70	100.70	129.60	142.80	590.20
2nd place, silver medalist(s)	Gary Hunt	Great Britain	106.40	106.60	102.60	170.10	103.60	589.30
3rd place, bronze medalist(s)	Jonathan Paredes	Mexico	102.60	110.70	102.60	129.85	132.60	578.35
4	Michal Navrátil	Czech Republic	102.60	104.55	98.80	115.15	119.60	540.70
5	Matthew Cowen	Great Britain	95.00	102.50	96.90	135.20	110.00	539.60
6	Artem Silchenko	Russia	95.00	120.95	102.60	128.80	73.20	520.55
7	Anatoliy Shabotenko	Ukraine	85.50	73.80	102.60	127.50	109.20	498.60
8	Kris Kolanus	Poland	85.50	67.65	88.20	107.80	120.00	469.15
9	Steve LoBue	United States	102.60	98.40	70.30	79.30	95.20	445.80
10	Blake Aldridge	Great Britain	83.60	90.20	91.20	91.35	86.80	443.15
11	Kent DeMond	United States	85.50	86.10	85.50	88.20	75.40	420.70
12	Cyrille Oumedjkane	France	62.70	92.25	79.80	93.60	75.00	403.35
13	Jorge Ferzuli	Mexico	83.60	12.00	64.80	95.00	100.80	356.20
