= World Aquatics Athletes of the Year =

The World Aquatics Athletes of the Year (formerly FINA Athletes of the Year) is a set of awards presented by World Aquatics (International Swimming Federation) and the FINA Aquatics World Magazine. Each recognises excellence in five categories of aquatic sports: swimming, diving, synchronized swimming, water polo and open water swimming. The award was inaugurated in 2010.

== Swimming ==
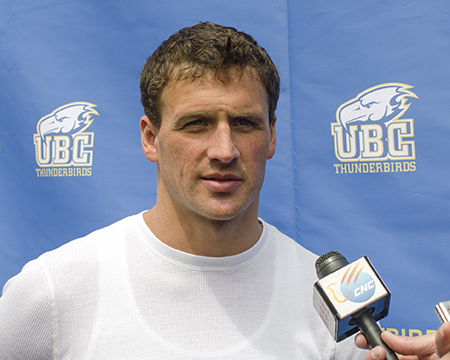
Ryan Lochte, inaugural and three-time winner of the World Aquatics Male Swimmer of the Year honour.

Year	Female winner	Nationality	Male winner	Nationality	Ref
2010	Therese Alshammar	Sweden	Ryan Lochte	United States	
2011	Missy Franklin	United States	Ryan Lochte (2)	United States	
2012	Missy Franklin (2)	United States	Michael Phelps	United States	
2013	Katie Ledecky	United States	Ryan Lochte (3)	United States	
2014	Katinka Hosszú	Hungary	Chad le Clos	South Africa	
2015	Katinka Hosszú (2)	Hungary	Mitch Larkin	Australia	
2016	Katinka Hosszú (3)	Hungary	Michael Phelps (2)	United States	
2017	Sarah Sjöström	Sweden	Caeleb Dressel	United States	
2018	Katinka Hosszú (4)	Hungary	Chad le Clos (2)	South Africa	
2019	Sarah Sjöström (2)	Sweden	Caeleb Dressel (2)	United States	
2021	Emma McKeon	Australia	Caeleb Dressel (3)	United States	
2022	Katie Ledecky (2)	United States	David Popovici	Romania	
2023	Kaylee McKeown	Australia	Qin Haiyang	China	
2024	Summer McIntosh	Canada	Léon Marchand	France	
2025	Summer McIntosh (2)	Canada	Léon Marchand (2)	France	

=== Best swimming performance ===
Year	Female winner	Nationality	Male winner	Nationality
2015	Katie Ledecky	United States	Adam Peaty	United Kingdom
2016	Katie Ledecky (2)	United States	Adam Peaty (2)	United Kingdom

== Water polo ==
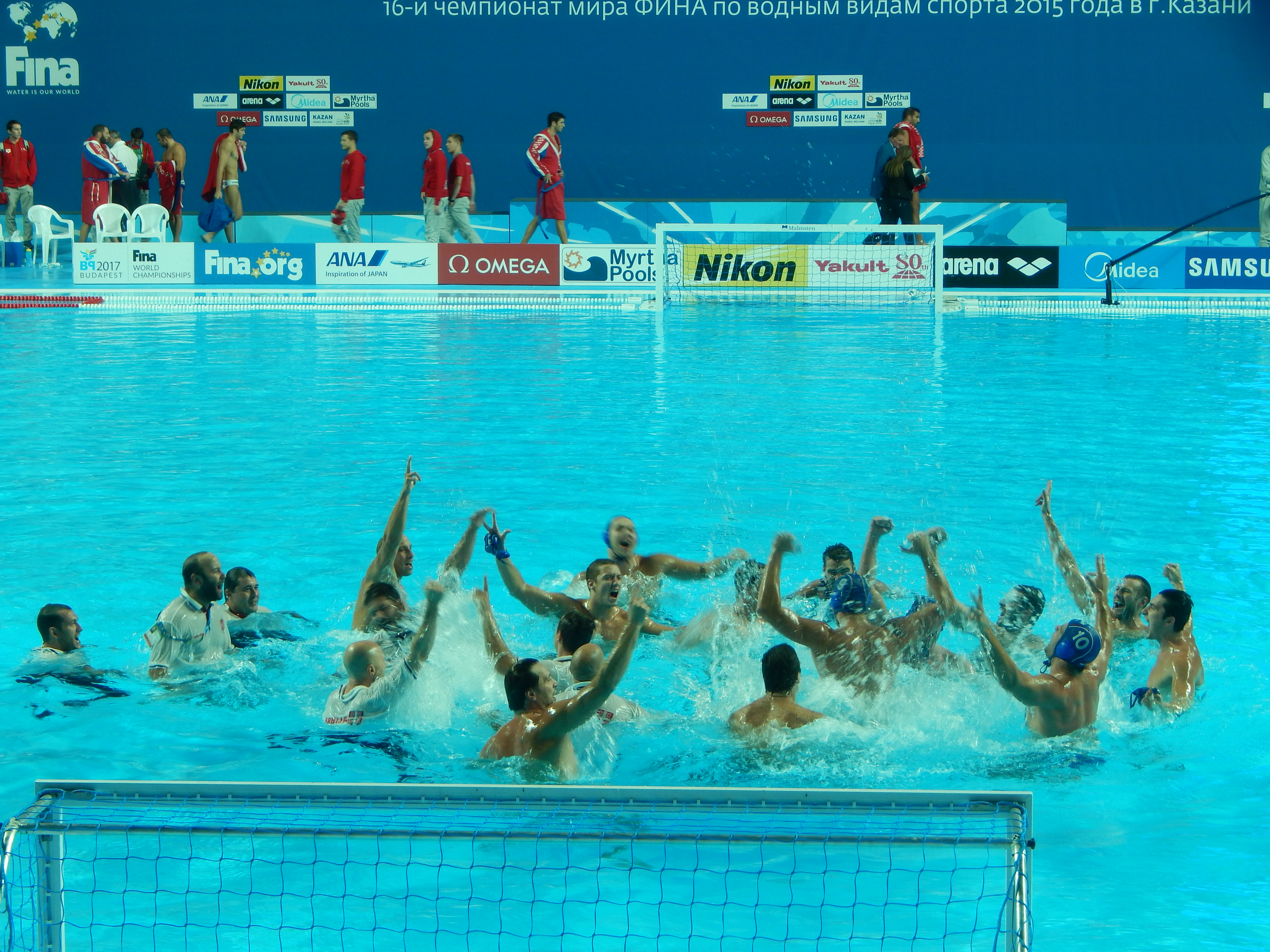
Serbia men's national water polo team

Year	Female winner	Nationality	Male winner	Nationality
2009	Elizabeth Armstrong	United States	Filip Filipović	Serbia
2010	Elizabeth Armstrong	United States	Vanja Udovičić	Serbia
2011	Alexandra Asimaki	Greece	Filip Filipović	Serbia
2012	Maggie Steffens	United States	Josip Pavić	Croatia
2013	Jennifer Pareja	Spain	Dénes Varga	Hungary
2014	Maggie Steffens (2)	United States	Filip Filipović	Serbia
Year	Female team winner		Male team winner	
2015	United States		Serbia	
2016	United States (2)		Serbia (2)	
2017	United States (3)		Croatia	
2018	United States (4)		Hungary	
2019	United States (5) |-		Francesco Di Fulvio	Italy
2020			Dušan Mandić	Serbia
2021	Maggie Steffens (3)	United States	Filip Filipović	Serbia
2022	Maddie Musselman	United States	Felipe Perrone	Spain
2023	Brigitte Sleeking	Netherlands	Gergő Zalánki	Hungary
2024	Beatriz Ortiz	Spain	Dušan Mandić (2)	Serbia

== Diving ==
Year	Female winner	Nationality	Male winner	Nationality
2010	Chen Ruolin	China	Patrick Hausding	Germany
2011	Wu Minxia	China	Qiu Bo	China
2012	Wu Minxia (2)	China	Ilya Zakharov	Russia
2013	He Zi	China	He Chong	China
2014	Liu Huixia	China	Cao Yuan	China
2015	Shi Tingmao	China	He Chao	China
2016	Shi Tingmao (2)	China	Chen Aisen	China
2017	Shi Tingmao (3)	China	Thomas Daley	United Kingdom
2018	Shi Tingmao (4)	China	Cao Yuan (2)	China
2019	Shi Tingmao (5)	China	Xie Siyi	China
2021	Shi Tingmao (6)	China	Xie Siyi (2)	China
2022	Chen Yiwen	China	Wang Zongyuan	China
2023	Chen Yiwen (2)	China	Cassiel Rousseau	Australia

== High diving ==
Year	Female winner	Nationality	Male winner	Nationality
2013	Cesilie Carlton	United States	Orlando Duque	Colombia
2014	Rachelle Simpson	United States	Orlando Duque (2)	Colombia
2015	Rachelle Simpson (2)	United States	Gary Hunt	United Kingdom
2016	Lysanne Richard	Canada	Gary Hunt (2)	United Kingdom
2017	Rhiannan Iffland	Australia	Steven LoBue	United States
2018	Rhiannan Iffland (2)	Australia	Gary Hunt (3)	United Kingdom
2019	Rhiannan Iffland (3)	Australia	Gary Hunt (4)	United Kingdom
2021	Ellie Smart	United States	Owen Weymouth	United Kingdom
2022	Rhiannan Iffland (4)	Australia	Aidan Heslop	United Kingdom

== Artistic swimming ==
Year	Winner	Nationality
2010	Natalia Ishchenko	Russia
2011	Natalia Ishchenko (2); Svetlana Romashina	Russia; Russia
2012	Natalia Ishchenko (3)	Russia
2013	Svetlana Romashina (2)	Russia
2014	Huang Xuechen	China

Year	Female winner	Nationality	Male winner	Nationality
2015	Svetlana Romashina (3)	Russia	Aleksandr Maltsev; Bill May	Russia; United States
2016	Natalia Ishchenko (4); Svetlana Romashina (4)	Russia; Russia		
2017	Svetlana Kolesnichenko	Russia	Giorgio Minisini; Aleksandr Maltsev (2)	Italy; Russia
2018	Yelyzaveta Yakhno	Ukraine	Giorgio Minisini (2)	Italy
2019	Svetlana Romashina (5); Svetlana Kolesnichenko (2)	Russia; Russia	Aleksandr Maltsev (3)	Russia
2021	Svetlana Romashina (6); Svetlana Kolesnichenko (3)	Russia; Russia	Aleksandr Maltsev (4)	Russia
2022	Yukiko Inui	Japan	Giorgio Minisini (3)	Italy

== Open water swimming ==
Year	Female winner	Nationality	Male winner	Nationality
2010	Ana Marcela Cunha	Brazil	Valerio Cleri	Italy
2011	Keri-Anne Payne	United Kingdom	Thomas Lurz	Germany
2012	Éva Risztov	Hungary	Oussama Mellouli	Tunisia
2013	Poliana Okimoto	Brazil	Thomas Lurz (2)	Germany
2014	Ana Marcela Cunha (2)	Brazil	Allan do Carmo	Brazil
2015	Ana Marcela Cunha (3)	Brazil	Jordan Wilimovsky	United States
2016	Sharon van Rouwendaal	Netherlands	Ferry Weertman	Netherlands
2017	Ana Marcela Cunha (4)	Brazil	Marc-Antoine Olivier	France
2018	Ana Marcela Cunha (5)	Brazil	Ferry Weertman (2)	Netherlands
2019	Ana Marcela Cunha (6)	Brazil	Kristóf Rasovszky	Hungary
2021	Ana Marcela Cunha (7)	Brazil	Florian Wellbrock	Germany
2022	Ana Marcela Cunha (8)	Brazil	Gregorio Paltrinieri	Italy

== See also ==
- List of Swimming World Swimmers of the Year
- International Swimming Hall of Fame
