= High diving at the 2025 World Aquatics Championships – Men =

Men at the High diving at the 2025 World Aquatics Championships
- Venue: Sentosa Island
- Location: Singapore
- Dates: 24 July (Round 1–2); 25 July (Round 3–4); 27 July (Round 5–6)
- Competitors: 23 from 15 nations
- Winning points: 428.90

Medalists
| gold medal | James Lichtenstein | United States |
| silver medal | Carlos Gimeno | Spain |
| bronze medal | Constantin Popovici | Romania |

The Men competition at the 2025 World Aquatics Championships was held from 24 to 27 July 2025.

== Results ==
The first two rounds were started on 24 July at 14:02. The rounds 3 and 4 were started on 25 July at 14:02. Round 5 was held on 27 July at 11:02. The final round was held on 27 July at 11:29.

| Rank | Diver | Nationality | Round 1 | Round 2 | Round 3 | Round 4 | Round 5 | Round 6 | Total |
|---|---|---|---|---|---|---|---|---|---|
| 1st place, gold medalist(s) | James Lichtenstein | United States | 70.00 | 142.80 | 95.40 | 103.35 | 120.40 | 143.10 | 428.90 |
| 2nd place, silver medalist(s) | Carlos Gimeno | Spain | 75.60 | 142.80 | 91.80 | 140.45 | 120.40 | 114.80 | 425.30 |
| 3rd place, bronze medalist(s) | Constantin Popovici | Romania | 68.60 | 147.90 | 91.80 | 144.00 | 143.10 | 141.00 | 408.70 |
| 4 | Jonathan Paredes | Mexico | 71.40 | 110.40 | 91.80 | 105.75 | 117.30 | 126.90 | 407.40 |
| 5 | Cătălin Preda | Romania | 68.60 | 109.65 | 95.40 | 118.95 | 91.80 | 149.45 | 405.25 |
| 6 | Gary Hunt | France | 75.60 | 124.95 | 72.00 | 114.40 | 102.90 | 124.80 | 375.30 |
| 6 | Andrea Barnaba | Italy | 68.60 | 106.40 | 91.80 | 112.70 | 104.50 | 110.40 | 375.30 |
| 8 | David Colturi | United States | 67.20 | 82.80 | 97.20 | 108.10 | 89.70 | 112.70 | 366.80 |
| 9 | Oleksiy Pryhorov | Ukraine | 64.40 | 109.65 | 70.20 | 113.40 | 117.30 | 108.00 | 359.90 |
| 10 | Miguel García | Colombia | 67.20 | 115.15 | 73.80 | 109.20 | 80.85 | 119.60 | 341.45 |
| 11 | Scott Lazeroff | United States | 49.00 | 93.60 | 84.60 | 106.00 | 104.00 | 103.35 | 340.95 |
| 12 | Davide Baraldi | Italy | 61.60 | 98.40 | 86.40 | 96.60 | 86.10 | 89.70 | 323.80 |
| 13 | Braden Rumpit | New Zealand | 58.80 | 103.50 | 77.40 | 85.80 | 105.80 | 79.20 | 321.20 |
| 14 | Juan Gil | Colombia | 54.60 | 71.75 | 75.60 | 108.10 | 49.20 | 55.20 | 234.60 |
| 15 | Michael Foisy | Canada | 42.00 | 92.40 | 72.00 | 101.20 | Did not advance | | |
| 16 | Zach Picton | Australia | 40.60 | 81.00 | 70.20 | 103.35 | Did not advance | | |
| 17 | Antonio Corzo | Mexico | 44.80 | 85.80 | 59.40 | 98.90 | Did not advance | | |
| 18 | Pierrick Schafer | Switzerland | 58.80 | 103.40 | 75.60 | 38.70 | Did not advance | | |
| 19 | Jean-David Duval | Switzerland | 54.60 | 79.95 | 61.20 | 75.85 | Did not advance | | |
| 20 | Nikita Fedotov | Armenia | 71.40 | 57.60 | 81.00 | 16.10 | Did not advance | | |
| 21 | Choi Byung-hwa | South Korea | 50.40 | 57.00 | 43.20 | 61.20 | Did not advance | | |
| 22 | Jucelino Lima | Brazil | 50.40 | 79.95 | 41.85 | 0.00 | Did not advance | | |
| 23 | Miguel Cardoso | Brazil | 49.00 | 0.00 | 60.45 | 35.65 | Did not advance | | |
