= James Lichtenstein =

American high diver (born 1994)

Personal information
- Nationality: American
- Born: October 26, 1994 (age 31) Buffalo Grove, Illinois, U.S.

Sport
- Country: United States
- Sport: High diving
- Coached by: Steven LoBue
Medal record
Men's high diving
Representing the United States
World Championships
Gold medal – first place	2025 Singapore	Men

James Lichtenstein (born October 26, 1994) is an American high diver. He won a gold medal at the 2025 World Aquatics Championships in high diving.

== Early life and education ==
Lichtenstein was born to Mitch and Judy Lichtenstein, and has a sister, Jennifer. He attended Adlai E. Stevenson High School in Lincolnshire, Illinois, where he competed in both diving and track and field. He then attended the University of Notre Dame where he was a member of the diving team.

== Career ==
Lichtenstein was invited to join the Red Bull Cliff Diving World Series in 2022. He made his World Aquatics Championships debut in 2023 and finished in seventh place in the high diving event with a score of 390.20.

He again competed at the 2024 World Aquatics Championships and finished in fourth place in the high diving event with a score of 376.60. He competed at the 2025 World Aquatics Championships and won a gold medal in the high diving event with a score of 428.90. He became the first American to win gold in the event since Steven LoBue in 2017. This was team USA's first gold medal of the 2025 World Aquatics Championships.
