= Michal Navrátil =

Michal Navrátil may refer to:

- Michal Navrátil (diver)
- Michal Navrátil (tennis)
