= 2014 FINA High Diving World Cup =

International diving competition

The 2014 FINA High Diving World Cup was held in Kazan, Russia, from 8 August to 10 August 2014. It was the first edition of the FINA High Diving World Cup competition. The event consisted of a men's competition from the 27m platform (won by Orlando Duque) and a women's competition from the 20m platform (won by Rachelle Simpson).
