= Carlos Gimeno (diver) =

Spanish high diver (born 1989)

Personal information
- Full name: Carlos Javier Gimeno Martínez
- Nationality: Spanish
- Born: 24 October 1989 (age 36)

Sport
- Country: Spain
- Sport: High diving
Medal record
Men's High diving
Representing Spain
World Championships
Silver medal – second place	2025 Singapore	Men

Carlos Javier Gimeno Martínez (born 24 October 1989) is a Spanish high diver. He won Spain's first high diving medal at the 2025 World Aquatics Championships.

== Career ==
During the 2023 Red Bull Cliff Diving World Series, Gimeno finished third overall in the standings. During the 2025 Red Bull Cliff Diving World Series he again finished third overall.

Gimeno made his World Aquatics Championships debut in 2015. In July 2025, he competed at the 2025 World Aquatics Championships and won a silver medal in the high diving event with a total score of 425.30 points. This marked Spain's first medal in high diving at the World Championships.

In August 2026, he competed at the 2026 European Aquatics Championships in high diving. After the first two rounds he ranked second with a total score of 183.60 points.

== Personal life ==
Gimeno is married to Georgia Sturt, and have a son, Jayden. They met while both performing in the House of Dancing Water.
