= Inis Mór =

Inis Mór, Irish for "big island", may refer to:

- Inishmore, one of the Aran Islands
- Deer Island, in the Shannon Estuary
- Church Island, in Lough Gill
