= Gavin Brown (diver) =

English diver

- Born: 9 August 1984
- Died: 8 April 2007 (aged 22)

Gavin Brown (9 August 1984 – 28 April 2007), sometimes listed as Gavin Hustler-Brown, was a diver from Cottingley, Bradford in West Yorkshire, England. The former diving partner of Olympian Blake Aldridge, Brown died at the age of 22 following a hit-and-run incident.

== Early life and career ==
At age 13, Brown began to train at the City of Leeds Diving Club under Coach Adrian Hinchliffe. In 1998, Gavin took fourth place at the Junior European Championships. A year later, he won a bronze medal at the Junior World Championships.

At age 14, Brown reached the senior European cup finals and in 2000, Gavin won medals at the Six Nations International at Southampton. In 2001, he took part in the Goodwill Games in Brisbane, Australia where he competed with future Olympic diver Blake Aldridge.

Brown moved to Southampton in 2005 to continue his training with the Southampton Diving Academy at The Quays. After joining Southampton Academy, he was coached by both Steve Gladding and former Olympic diver Lindsey Fraser. The same year, Brown began studying Criminology at Solent University and took part in the Solent University Talented Athlete Network Development (STAND) programme which offers different levels of support to student athletes. He also started coaching other divers and in 2007 he was preparing a group of teenagers for the National Skills Finals in Plymouth. He was due to compete in the World Cup High Diving Contest the summer of 2007.

== Death and aftermath ==
On 28 April 2007 at about 2 A.M, Gavin Brown was struck by the driver of a blue Vauxhall Astra as he walked near the Hobbit Pub, on Bevois Valley Road, Southampton. He was taken to Southampton General Hospital but despite emergency treatment he died from massive head trauma.

The driver of the blue Vauxhall Astra did not stop and the car was discovered abandoned three hours later on a nearby street. Police released a photograph of the car and a firm of solicitors offered a £1,000 reward to find whoever was responsible.

Police investigating the fatal crash soon identified Lukasz Banasik, a farm labourer, as a suspect and believed that he fled the country for his native Poland. The police in Hampshire, England secured a European Arrest Warrant and worked with police across Europe to try to locate Banasik. Polish police officers, visiting the United Kingdom in March 2009 for an Officer Exchange, were briefed on Operation Rhone (the Hampshire Police code-name for the investigation into the fatal hit-and-run).

In July 2009, Lukasz Banasik was arrested near Gdańsk, Poland and flown to England. Lukasz Banasik pleaded guilty to causing death by dangerous driving, failing to stop after an accident, failing to report an accident, driving without insurance and driving without a licence. On 26 February 2010, he was sentenced to five years in jail.

== Tributes and legacy ==
=== Gavin Brown Trophy ===
In October 2007, the first Gavin Brown Trophy was given at the Southampton Invitational competition held at the Quays Swimming and Diving Complex. The specially designed trophy was created with the image of a diving Gavin etched into a glass block. Winners of the trophy are divers in any of the age group events (excluding seniors) who achieves the highest raw score on a back or reverse rotating dive.

=== Gavin Brown Love to Dive Competition ===
In February 2008, the first "Gavin Brown Love to Dive" Competition for novice and recreational divers was held at the Quays Swimming & Diving Complex in Southampton. Members of the diving squad that Gavin coached before he died formed part of the organizing team. The amateur diving competition has separate categories for springboard and highboard, divided by gender and age group. The competition currently attracts recreational divers from across England.

=== Blake Aldridge's Charity Jump ===
In June 2009, Olympic diver Blake Aldridge made a solo parachute jump for the charity Brake in memory of Blake's former synchronized diving partner, Gavin Brown. The Brake (charity) is working to stop death and injury on UK roads and to support people who have been bereaved or injured by a road crash. Blake's jump raised over £1,000.

=== G STAR Diving Championship ===
Formerly the Northern Cross Diving Championship this was renamed in 2007 to G Star in memory of Gavin Brown. G Star is one of Gavin's old nicknames from his time at Leeds Diving. Each year the Gavin Brown trophy is awarded to the diver of the meet, which is voted on by the coaches attending the event.
