= Ik Kil =

Cenote in Yucatan, Mexico

Coordinates: 20.6609°N 88.5505°W

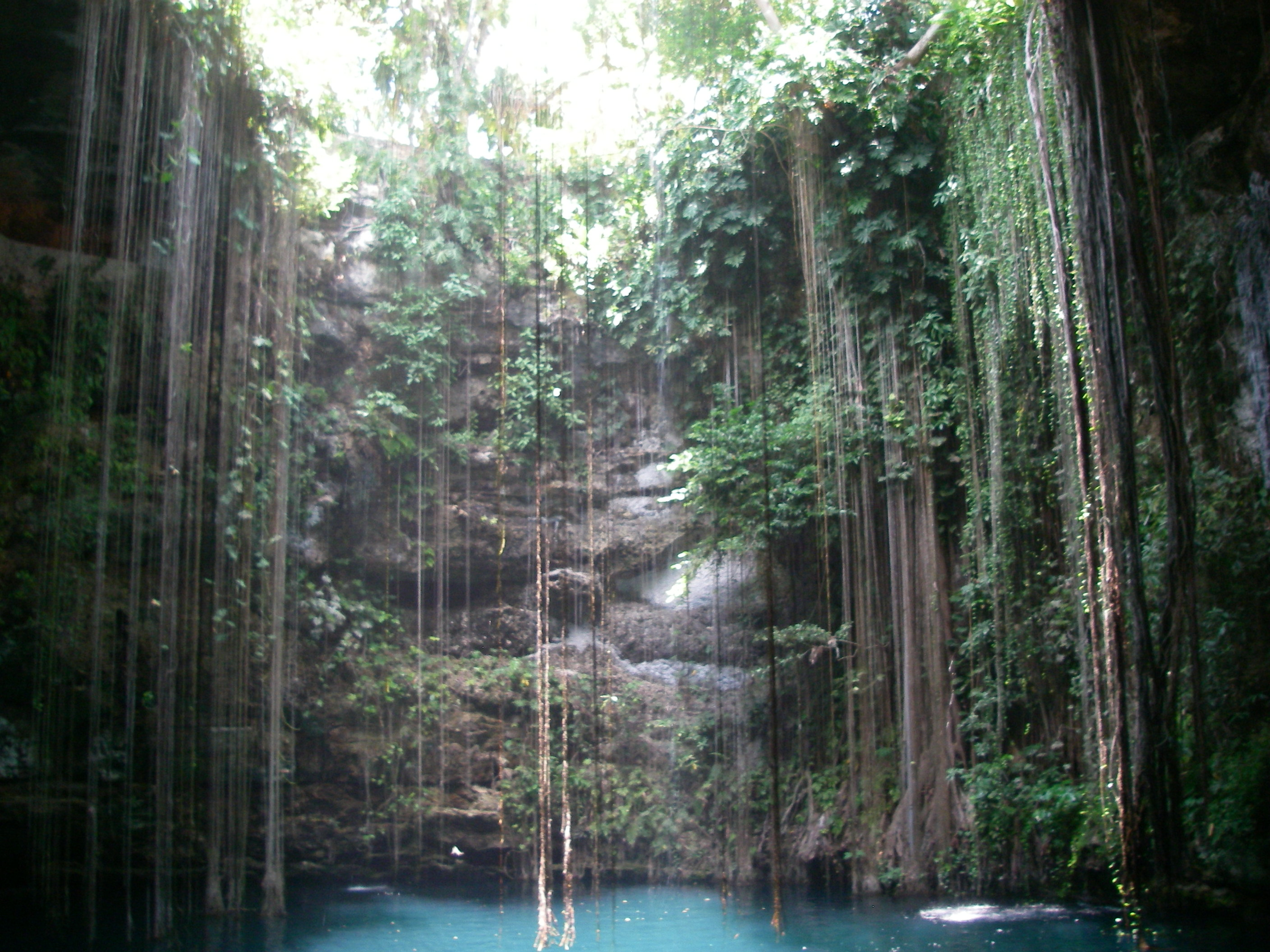
The cenote at Ik Kil

Ik Kil is a cenote outside Pisté in the Tinúm Municipality, Yucatán, Mexico. It is located in the northern center of the Yucatán Peninsula and is part of the Ik Kil Archeological Park near Chichen Itza. It is open to the public for swimming.

== Description ==
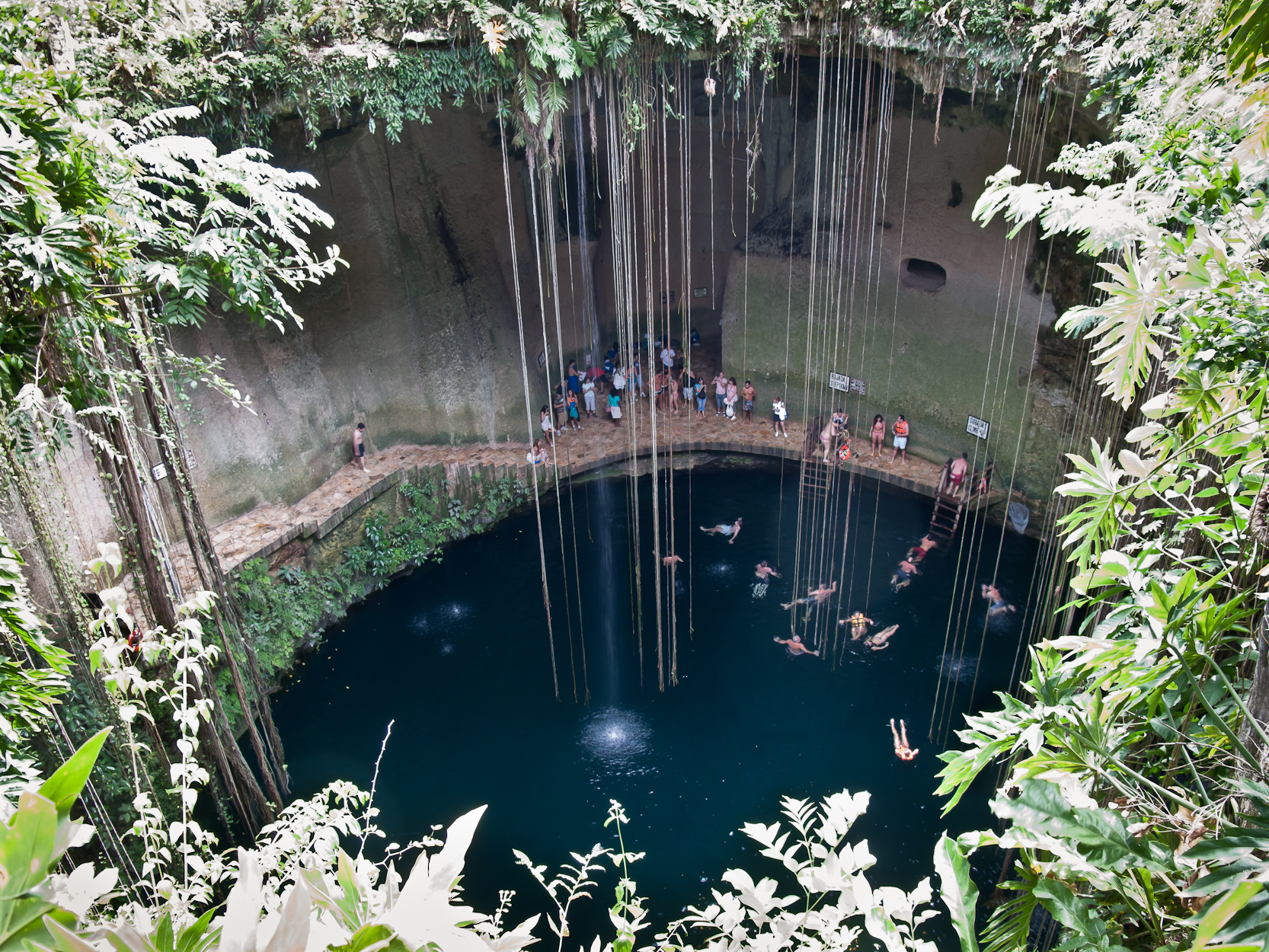
Looking down into the cenote

The cenote is open to the sky with the water level about 26 metres (85 ft) below ground level. It is about 60 metres (200 ft) in diameter and about 48 metres (157 ft) deep. A carved stairway leads down to a swimming platform.

Cenote Ik Kil is near the Maya ruins of Chichen Itza, on the highway to Valladolid. Ik Kil was considered sacred by the Maya who used the site as a location for human sacrifice to their rain god, Chaac. Bones and pieces of jewelry have been found in the waters of the cenote by archaeologists and speleologists.

The cenote is part of a complex that includes a restaurant and hotel. Ik Kil was a location on the Red Bull Cliff Diving World Series in 2010, 2011 and 2014.

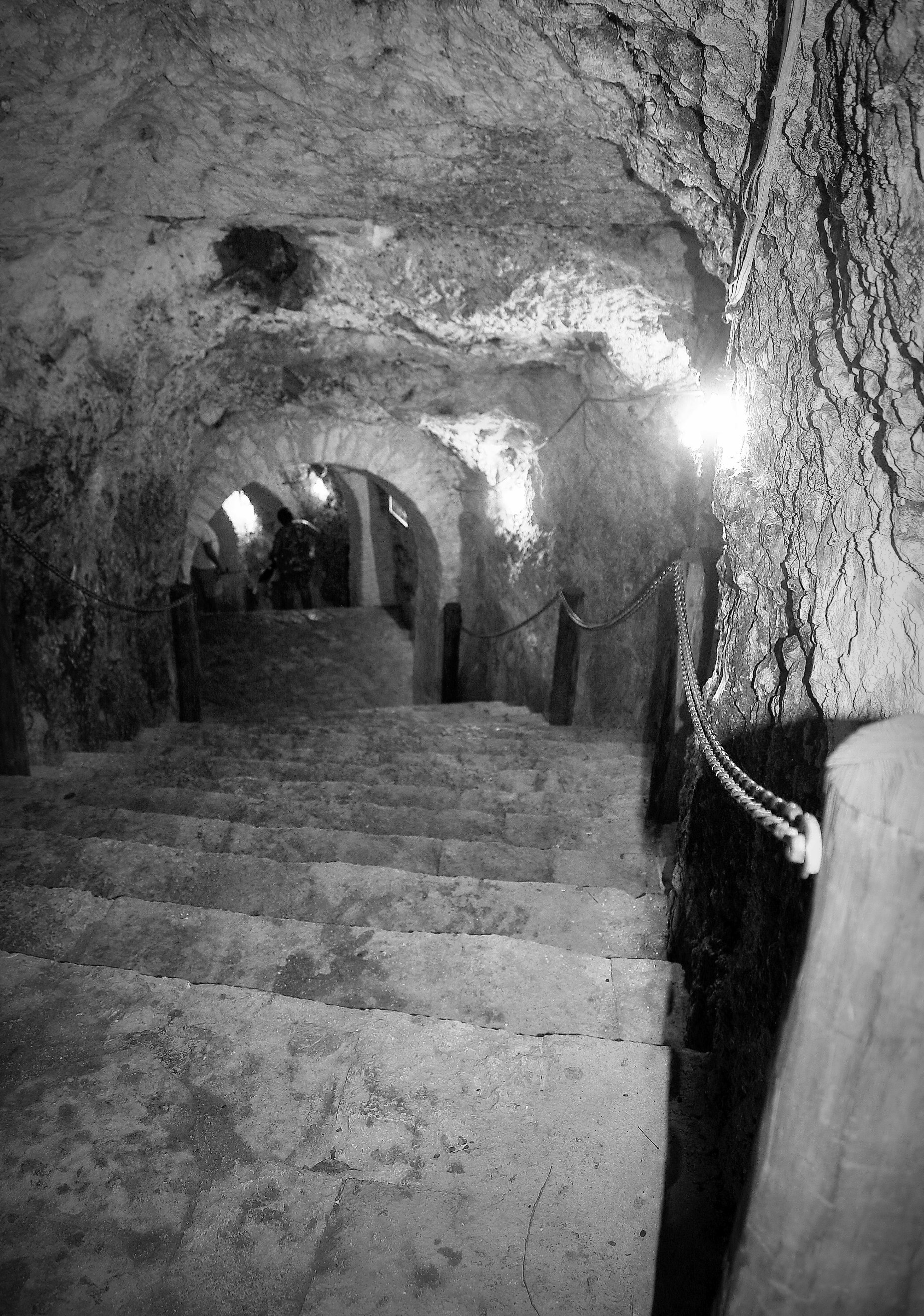
Stairs to access

== See also ==
- List of sinkholes of Mexico
