= Jonathan Paredes (diver) =

Mexican high diver (born 1989)

Personal information
- Full name: Jonathan Paredes Bernal
- Born: 14 August 1989 (age 36) Mexico City, Mexico
- Height: 1.65 m (5 ft 5 in)
- Weight: 62 kg (137 lb)

Sport
- Country: Mexico
- Sport: High diving
Medal record
Representing Mexico
World Championships
Silver medal – second place	2015 Kazan	Men
Bronze medal – third place	2013 Barcelona	Men
Bronze medal – third place	2019 Gwangju	Men
Red Bull Cliff Diving World Series
Gold medal – first place	2017	Men
Silver medal – second place	2019	Men
Silver medal – second place	2016	Men
Bronze medal – third place	2015	Men
Bronze medal – third place	2018	Men

Jonathan Paredes Bernal (Note: In this Spanish name, the first or paternal surname is Paredes and the second or maternal family name is Bernal.) (born 14 August 1989) is a Mexican high diver who won the bronze medal at the 2013 World Aquatics Championships in Barcelona at the high diving event behind Orlando Duque and Gary Hunt.
