= Lysanne Richard =

Canadian high diver (born 1981)

Personal information
- Born: 30 August 1981 (age 44)

Sport
- Country: Canada
- Sport: High diving

Lysanne Richard (born 30 August 1981) is a Canadian high diver and acrobat. She represented Canada at the 2015 World Aquatics Championships in Kazan, Russia and she finished in 5th place in the women's high diving event. She was not able to represent Canada at the 2017 World Aquatics Championships as she had to withdraw from the competition after sustaining a neck injury.

In 2016, she won the FINA Athlete of the Year award in her category (women's high diving).

In 2018, she won the bronze medal in the 2018 Red Bull Cliff Diving World Series. She also won the bronze medal in the 2019 Red Bull Cliff Diving World Series.

She was one of the housemates in the second season of Big Brother Célébrités, the Quebec celebrity version of the international reality show Big Brother.

Prior to discovering high diving, she has a career as a trained acrobat and aristic trampolinist with the Cirque du Soleil.
