= Andy Jones (diver) =

American high-diver & acrobat

Personal information
- Born: Andrew Francis Jones; April 21, 1985 (age 40); Anchorage, Alaska, United States

Andrew Francis Jones (born April 21, 1985) is an American high diver, acrobat, and stuntman.

== Education ==
Jones graduated from Jordan High School in 2003. He went on to receive a B.Sc. from the University of Utah while also a member of the University Dive Team.

== College ==
Jones began competitive diving his senior year in high school. He was a walk member of the University of Utah Swimming and Diving team in his freshman year, 2003–2004. He excelled quickly and competed all four years during his collegiate education. In 2007 he was placed 3rd in the Mountain West Conference 10m Platform Championships.

== Cirque du Soleil ==
Jones was a member of the O show of Cirque du Soleil from 2009–2014.

== Red Bull Cliff Diving ==
Jones started diving as a wildcard with the Red Bull Cliff Diving World Series in 2011 and has dived as a member of the tour since 2014 tour.

Notable Finishes:

- Azores, Portugal (2015): 3rd
- Azores, Portugal (2016): 2nd
- La Rochelle, France (2016): 2nd
- Dubai, UAE (2016): 1st

== USA Diving ==
In 2014 Jones was selected to Team USA in 2014.

FINA World Cup

27m Platform

2014: 9th

2015: 6th

2016: 4th

FINA World Championships

27m Platform

2015: 5th
