= Michal Navrátil (diver) =

Czech diver

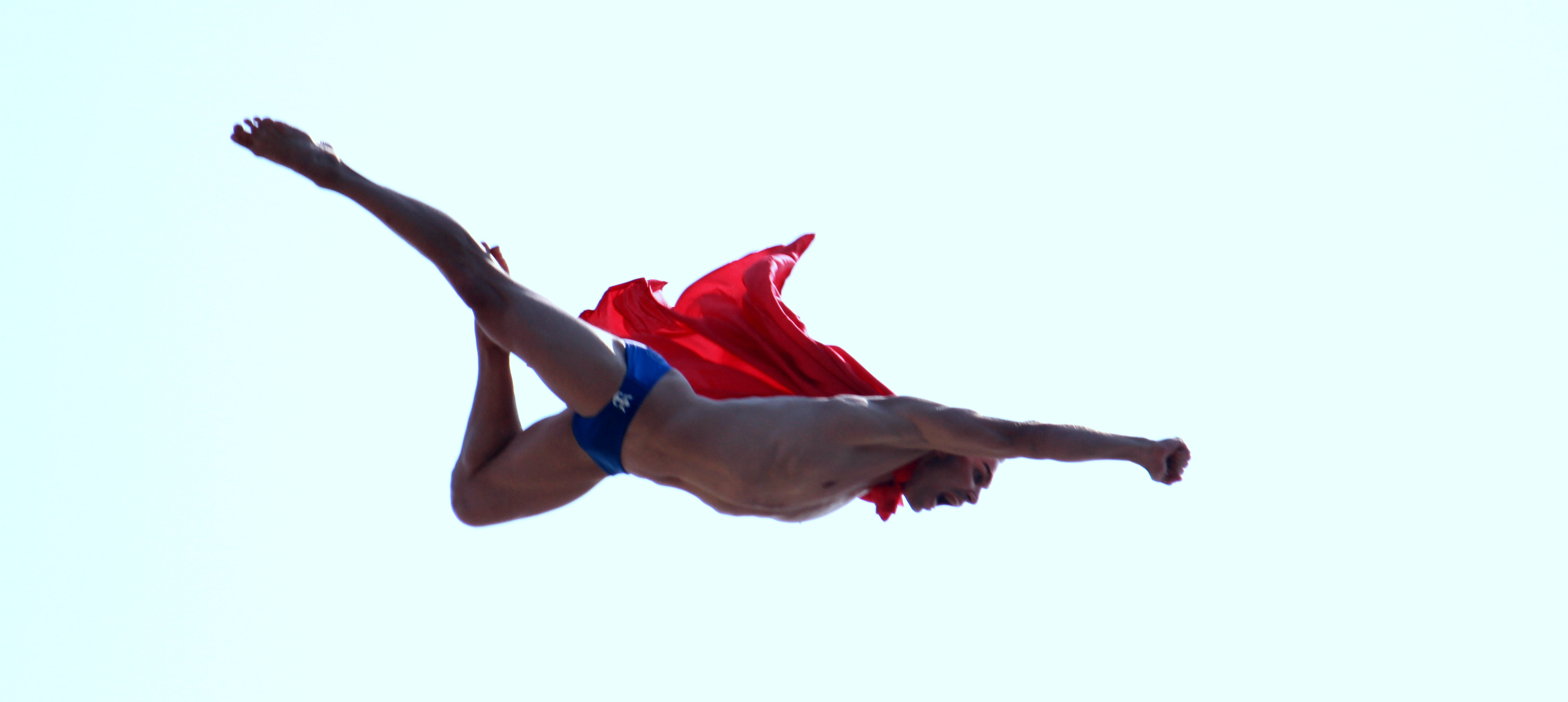

Personal information
- Born: 5 June 1985 (age 41) Prague, Czechoslovakia
- Height: 1.85 m (6 ft 1 in)
- Weight: 85 kg (187 lb)

Sport
- Country: Czech Republic
- Sport: Diving
- Event: High diving
Medal record
World Championships
Silver medal – second place	2017 Budapest	Men

Michal Navrátil (Czech pronunciation: [ˈmɪxal ˈnavraːtɪl]; born 5 June 1985) is a Czech professional diver.

== Personal life ==
Michal Navrátil was born in Prague, Czechoslovakia. His father introduced him to swimming competitions from the young age of five, he swam in the Nationals where he earned a 2nd-place finish in the 50m butterfly.

As an born athlete also competed in gymnastic competitions in club of Sparta Prague at the age of 10 after that he started his diver career in Sport Club USK Podolí where he earned a second-place finish in the Nationals on the 1 and 3 meter boards. In European competitions he was trained by Hana Novotná.

Navrátil's favorite dive is the triple somersault with half twist from 28 meters.

== Highdiving career ==
=== National Championships ===
Every last weekend of July and is located in the quarry of Hřiměždice in Central Bohemian Region
2002 1st place 12 and 16 meters
2003 2nd place 12 and 16 meters
2004 1st place 12 and 16 meters
2005 1st 16 meters
2006 2nd 12 meters
2007 1st place 12 and 16 meters
2009 1st place 12 and 16 meters

=== Mediterranean Championships - Marmeeting ===
This international sport event is located in Furore, Italy and is every year in first Sunday of July.
2008 7th
2011 1st

=== European Championships ===
Located in a small valley in the Swiss Italian mountains in Ponte Brolla in Switzerland.
Presented by WHDF World High Diving Federation every year in finals of July.

Year	Finish
2004	12th
2005	8th
2007	3rd
2008	3rd

== Cliffdiving career ==
Started with the annual Red Bull World Wide Series - Cliff Diving competition which draws hundreds of spectators to the sites around the world,
watchers hold their collective breath as the competitors take off from rocks and platforms set high on cliffs at 27 or 28 meters.

=== 2011 World Wide Series ===
Qualification Results: 1st Australia - Hawkesbury River

Results Stop 1: 5th Chile - Easter Island
Results Stop 2: 5th Mexico - Yucatan
Results Stop 3: 3rd Greece - Athens
Results Stop 4: 2nd France- La Rochelle
Results Stop 5: 3rd Italy - Polignano a Mare
Results Stop 6: 12th United States - Boston

Finals: 3rd Ukraine - Yalta

=== World Series Standings 2011 ===
1. Gary Hunt GBR
2. Artem Silchenko RUS
3. Michal Navrátil CZE
4. Slava Polyeshchuk UKR
5. Cyrille Oumedjkane FRA
6. Alain Kohl LUX
7. Sacha Kutsenko UKR
8. Orlando Duque COL
9. Kent De Mond USA
10. Steven LoBue USA
11. Jorge Ferzuli MEX
12. Hassan Mouti FRA

== Performing career ==
=== 2009 ===
He trained and performed for one year in Shenzhen Xiaomeisha Sea World in China.
China's leading marine-based theme park and entertainment complex that has attracted millions of visitors since opening in 1998.

=== 2010 ===
Gain contract with Royal Caribbean which is the most exclusive and largest luxury cruise lines in the world.
Performing in the diving and acrobatics show, Aqua Aria at the AquaTheater, the world first amphitheater at sea.

== Cinematography career ==
Performed in mainstream movies

2004 Jedna ruka netleská
2008 Wanted
2008 Babylon A.D.
