= Gary Hunt =

British diver (born 1984)

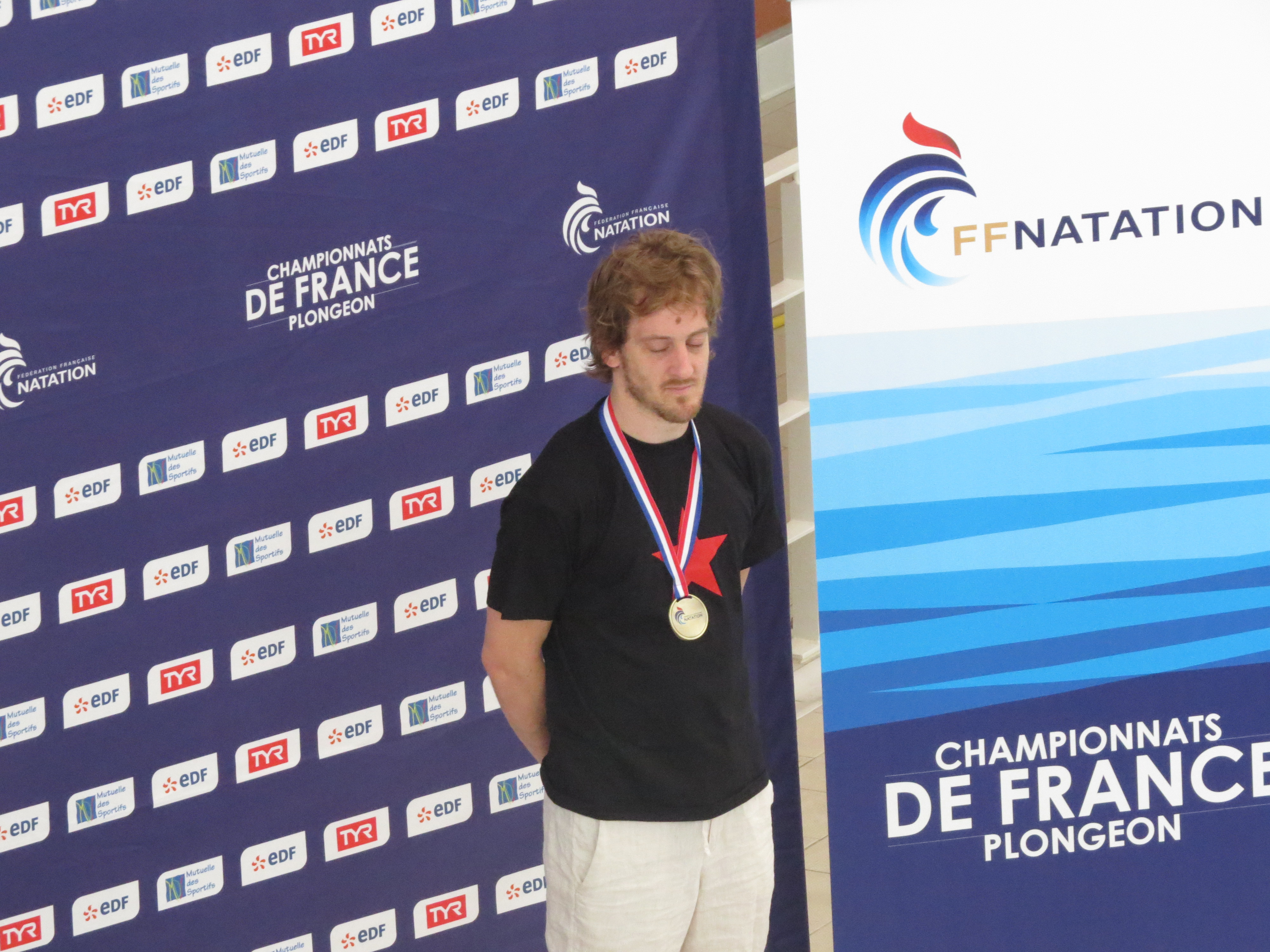
- 2019 French Diving Championships

Personal information
- Full name: Roger Gary Hunt
- Nationality: British-French (since 2020); British (until 2020)
- Born: 11 June 1984 (age 42) London, England
- Height: 1.76 m (5 ft 9 in)
- Life partner: Sabine Ravinet

Sport
- Country: France
- Sport: Diving, High diving
Medal record
Men's high diving
Representing Great Britain
World Championships
Gold medal – first place	2019 Gwangju	Men
Gold medal – first place	2015 Kazan	Men
Silver medal – second place	2013 Barcelona	Men
Representing France
Silver medal – second place	2024 Doha	Men
Bronze medal – third place	2023 Fukuoka	Men
European Championships
Bronze medal – third place	2026 Paris	Men
Men's diving
Representing England
Commonwealth Games
Bronze medal – third place	2006 Melbourne	10 m synchro

Gary Hunt (born 11 June 1984), also known as Roger Gary Hunt, is an elite sports diver, specialising in cliff or high diving, and is the 2019 World champion in high diving at World Aquatics Championships event, where he holds the championship record. With a silver in the 2013 edition of the event, Hunt is the most successful male diver in the short history of the FINA recognised event.

Hunt is a former Olympic hopeful and Commonwealth diver who has a number of medals at Great Britain National Diving championships and placed 3rd in the 10m Synchro event at the 2006 Commonwealth Games. He chose to focus his diving career in the niche area of cliff diving, and has enjoyed a rapid rise to the top of the sport. In 2010 he won the Red Bull Cliff Diving World Series, the premier championship within the sport, showing complete domination throughout the series and is thus considered to be the current reigning World Champion. He has a reputation for pushing the sport to new extremes and inventing new moves to stay ahead of his competition. He acquired French nationality in 2020. He represented France at the 2024 Summer Olympics, and placed 8th in the men's 10 metre synchronised platform event with partner Lois Szymczak.

== Early life and education ==
Hunt grew up in Leeds, England, and moved to Southampton after his parents, Pamela and Peter, separated. As a child, he followed his two older sisters into ballet, tap, modern dancing, and competitive swimming. Bored by swimming, he switched to diving. He attended Solent University and joined the Southampton Diving Academy.

== Cliff diving career ==
Before a meet, Hunt prepares by juggling, which he says slows his mind. He qualified for the Commonwealth Games in Melbourne in 2006, and placed third in the synchronised 10m platform event with Callum Johnstone. Hunt first began diving from above 10 metres in 2006 when his coach recommended him for a pirate show in the resort town of Lido di Jesolo. Hunt suffered from mental issues after the death of his best friend and fellow diver, Gavin Brown, in 2007.

He made his Red Bull debut in 2009. When not competing, Hunt played a Tarzan-like character at the Walygator Grand-Est in France for several years, where he met his partner, Sabine Ravinet. Hunt quit amusement park performances in 2013. At the World Aquatics Championships, he won a silver medal in 2013, and a gold medal in 2015 and again in 2019. He plans to compete for France at the 2024 Olympics in Paris. Hunt has no coach or agent, and his only corporate sponsor is Budgy Smuggler, an Australian swimwear company. Competitor Steven LoBue described Hunt as "the Michael Jordan, the Muhammad Ali, the Tiger Woods" of cliff diving.

=== 2009 season ===
2009 marked the beginning of Hunt's professional career in the sport after several years of training and competing in high diving events to build up his confidence and technique. He was quick to impress and finished 3rd, 3rd, 2nd and 2nd in the first 4 events of the series in France (La Rochelle), Netherlands (Rotterdam), Croatia (Dubrovnik) and Italy (Polignano A Mare).

His impressive start to the season meant he was in 2nd place in the overall championship at the halfway stage, 18 points behind 9-time World Champion Orlando Duque who had been dominating the 2009 season once again.

At the 5th event of the series in Turkey (Antalya), Hunt introduced his first new dive – a previously unattempted back piked 3 somersaults with 4 twists. The dive has a difficulty rating of 6.2 and is the most difficult dive to be performed in any form of competitive diving. Although he was only able to finished 3rd at this event, the new dive got a huge amount of attention, opened the eyes of the cliff diving community and began to cement Hunt's reputation as a fearless daredevil who was going to push the sport to new levels.

At the 6th event in Germany (Hamburg), Hunt achieved his first win, again using the triple quad. With Orlando Duque suffering from minor injuries and finishing 4th, Hunt closed the gap in the overall championship to 12 points.

At the 7th event in Switzerland (Sisikon), Hunt came 2nd by the narrowest of margins but was again able to stay ahead of Orlando Duque who finished 3rd. Hunt closed the gap in the championship to 9 points and was the only diver that could potentially beat Orlando going into the final event.

At the 8th and final event in Greece (Athens), Hunt introduced his 2nd new dive, another very technical dive with a very high difficulty rating – a forward piked 4 somersaults with 1.5 twists. With his second win of the series, and with Orlando finishing 4th, Hunt tied Orlando on points in the overall championship. However, Orlando was awarded the overall championship due to the fact that he had won more individual events over the year.

=== 2010 season ===
After finishing joint 1st in 2009, Hunt immediately resumed his rise to the top in 2010. Now confident with his 2 extreme dives, Hunt dominated the first event of the year in France (La Rochelle) and won comfortably, achieving scores of 10,10,10,9,9 for his final dive.

At the second event of the year in Mexico (Ik Kil), Hunt extended his lead on the series with another win. Once again his extreme dives with their high degree of difficulty were credited as the reason for his success.

A good lead in the overall championship allow him to change his front piked 4 somersaults 1.5 twists into 4 somersaults 2.5 twists.

At the third event of the year in Norway (Kragerø) Hunt made it three wins out of three events.

Hunt felt that the fourth event in Italy (Polignano A Mare) was the right time to unveil his new move – the running take off into front piked 4 somersaults 2.5 twists. As a requirement of the series, any diver wishing to use a new or unconventional dive must demonstrate the dive to the judges in practice sessions prior to the main competition in order to prove that they are capable of executing the dive. The judges have the power to stop an athlete using a particular dive in competition if they feel it is likely to be dangerous, and there was a lot of talk of this nature surrounding Hunt's new dive. Hunt was able to execute the dive during this practice session, finishing a little short but doing enough to convince the judges and once again made history in the sport with the first ever running take off. Unfortunately during the main competition Hunt performed the dive during the 3rd round of dives and received the most serious injury of the 2010 world series, when his entry point into the water coincided with the crest of a wave, meaning that he finished very short and took a large impact to his chest and head. He was taken to hospital with minor concussion but released later the same day with no further injuries or symptoms. Despite this, he was still able to finish 3rd at the event, due to a near-perfect triple quad during the 2nd round of dives.

Following the accident in Italy, Hunt chose to shelve the running take off dive for the time being, and returned to winning ways at the fifth event of the year in Switzerland (Sisikon) with another dominating performance, and another first for the series – Hunt achieved a points total of 417.50, the highest ever and the only score above 400 of the series.

At the sixth and final event in Hawaii (Hilo), Hunt finished second to Orlando Duque but only needed one point from the event to win the series, and was crowned World Champion on 12 September 2010.

=== 2016 season ===
Hunt won his 6th Red Bull Cliff Diving World series with 1350 points, 320 ahead of his nearest rival.

=== 2018 season ===
Hunt won his 7th Red Bull Cliff Diving World series with 1010 points.

=== 2019 season ===
Hunt won his 8th Red Bull Cliff Diving World series with 1160 points.

At the Red Bull Cliff Diving in Lebanon, in July 2019, he became the first diver in the series history to receive a perfect 10 score from each of the five judges.

=== 2021 season ===
Hunt won his 9th Red Bull Cliff Diving World series with 800 points.

=== 2022 season ===
Hunt won his 10th Red Bull Cliff Diving World series with 1240 points.

=== 2025 season ===
After 2 second places (El Nido, Polignano a Mare) and a third (Mostar), Hunt won his 11th Red Bull Cliff Diving World Series in Boston (September 20th), securing his return as a permanent diver for the 2026 season.
