= Blake Aldridge =

British synchronised diver

Personal information
- Born: 4 August 1982 (age 43); Lambeth, London, UK
- Height: 167 cm (5 ft 6 in)
- Weight: 64 kg (141 lb)

Sport
- Country: Great Britain
- Sport: Synchronized diving
- Event(s): 10m, 10m synchro
- Club: Crystal Palace Diving Club
- Former partner: Tom Daley

Blake Aldridge (born 4 August 1982) is a British synchronised diver, who dives for The Crystal Palace Diving Club. He is also a professional high diver and cliff diver on the Red Bull Cliff Diving World Series where he has won 6 podium finishes.

== Biography ==
Aldridge attended Downsview Primary School in Norbury London and then Stanley Technical High School for Boys in South Norwood London.

Aldridge's original synchro partner Gavin Brown was killed in a hit-and-run collision in Southampton on 28 April 2007.

During the Beijing 2008 Summer Olympics he took part in the Men's 10m Synchronised event with his new diving partner, Tom Daley, 12 years his junior. The pair finished in eighth position in the final in an event dominated by the Chinese who claimed the gold. He criticised the 14-year-old Daley during the competition, which subsequently resulted in Aldridge himself being criticised.

In February 2009, Daley's father, Rob, told BBC Devon, "If it was up to me, Tom would get a new partner". Shortly afterwards it was announced that Daley would be diving with Max Brick.

In May 2009 Aldridge paid an £80 police fixed penalty for shoplifting at B&Q.

On 19 February 2010, Aldridge was arrested on suspicion of shoplifting wine and causing actual bodily harm to a male security guard at a Tesco store in Croydon, Greater London. In August 2010 the case against him was dismissed when the CCTV was found and played in court.

In July 2009/2010/2011, Aldridge won the European Cliff Diving Championships for 3-year running, scoring 136.475 points, 38 points ahead of the next highest scoring dive. He also triumphed in 2011, beating Ukraine's Anatolii Shabotencko by over 60 points (372.325 vs 310.175).

He has had injury problems early in his career, notably detached retinas from a bad dive which required laser surgery.
