= Steven LoBue =

American high diver

Personal information
- Nationality: American
- Born: June 17, 1985 (age 41)
- Height: 1.61 m (5 ft 3 in)
- Weight: 62 kg (137 lb)

Sport
- Country: United States
- Sport: High diving
Medal record
World Championships
Gold medal – first place	2017 Budapest	Men
Silver medal – second place	2019 Gwangju	Men

Steven LoBue (born June 17, 1985) is an American high diver.

He participated at the 2017 and 2019 World Aquatics Championships, winning gold and silver medals respectively. LoBue has also been a top competitor on the Red Bull Cliff Diving World Series for many years.
