= Orlando Duque =

Colombian high diver

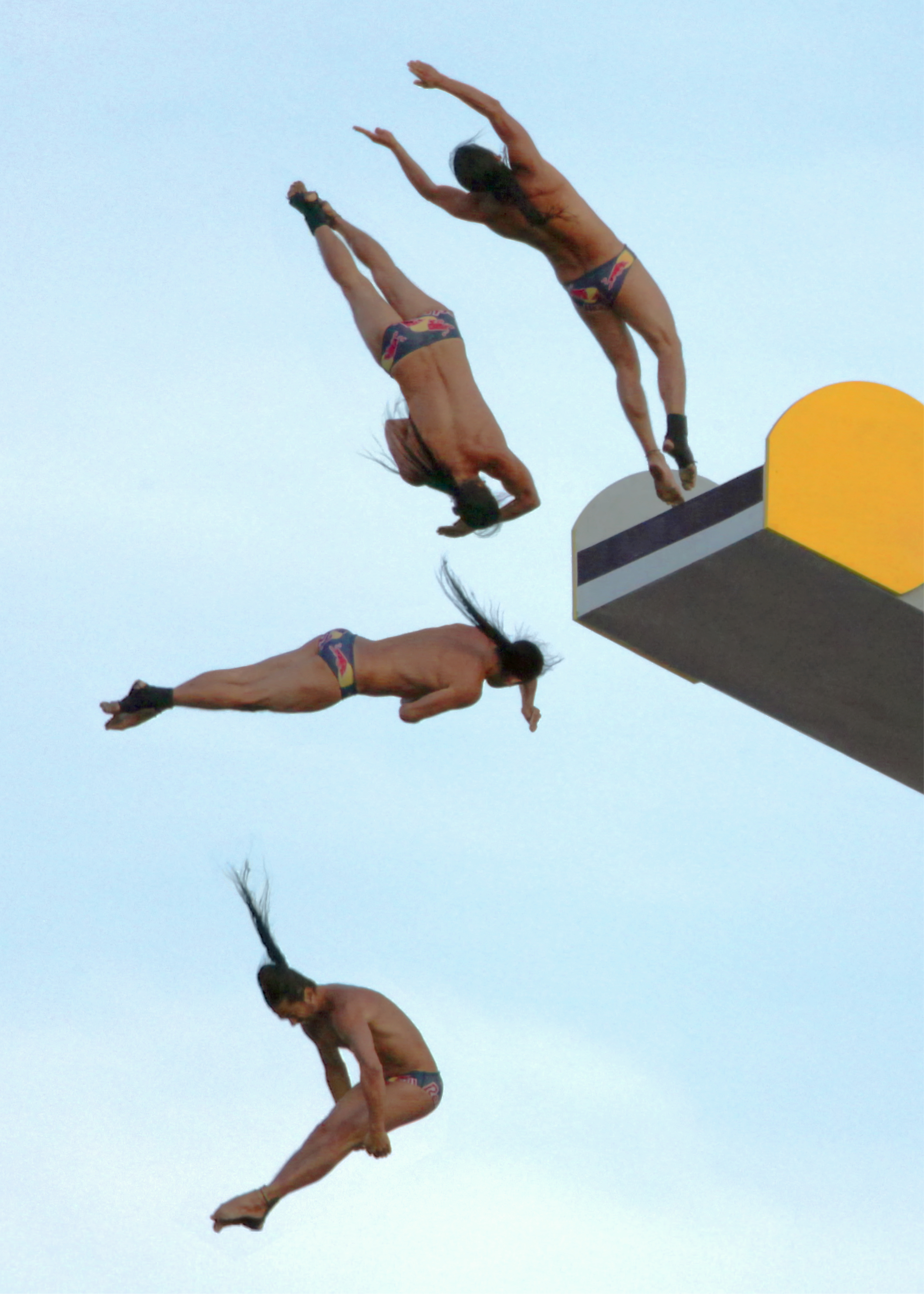

Medal record

Representing Colombia

Men's high diving

World Championships
Gold medal – first place	2013 Barcelona	High diving

Orlando Duque (born September 11, 1974 in Cali, Colombia) is a Colombian high diver. He won the first ever Gold medal in the sport at the 2013 World Aquatics Championships in Barcelona, Spain.

== Works ==
- High Diver. My Life on the Edge, PANTAURO, 2020.

Awards
Preceded by First award	FINA High Diver of the Year; 2013, 2014	Succeeded by (United Kingdom) Gary Hunt
