= Andrea Barnabà =

Italian high diver (born 2004)

Personal information
- Nationality: Italian
- Born: 4 June 2004 (age 22) Trieste, Italy

Sport
- Country: Italy
- Sport: High diving
Medal record
Men's High diving
Representing Italy
European Championships
Silver medal – second place	2026 Paris	Men
World Junior Championships
Gold medal – first place	2022 Montréal	15 m platform

Andrea Barnabà (born 4 June 2004) is an Italian high diver.

== Career ==
Barnabà began his career as a platform diver before switching to high diving at 16 years old.

He competed at the 2022 FINA World Junior Diving Championships and won a gold medal in the 15 metre platform. This was the first time that a high diving competition was incorporated into the World Aquatics Junior Diving Championships. He then made his World Aquatics Championships debut in 2023 and finished in fifteenth place in the high diving event.

In July 2025, he competed at the 2025 World Aquatics Championships and finished in sixth place in the high diving event with a score of 375.30. In August 2026, he competed at the 2026 European Aquatics Championships and won a silver medal in high diving with a score of 386.00 points.

== Personal life ==
Barnabà began dating fellow high diver Elisa Cosetti in late 2023.
