= Matteo Santoro =

Italian diver (born 2006)

Personal information
- Nationality: Italian
- Born: 9 October 2006 (age 19) Rome, Italy
- Height: 1.75 m (5 ft 9 in)
- Weight: 68 kg (150 lb)

Sport
- Country: Italy
- Sport: Diving
- Events: 1 m springboard, 3 m springboard, 3 m synchronised, 3 m mixed synchronised, mixed team event/>mixed team event
- Club: M.R. Sport Fratelli Marconi
- Coached by: Domenico Rinaldi
Medal record
Men's diving
Representing Italy
World Championships
Gold medal – first place	2025 Singapore	3 m mixed synchro
Silver medal – second place	2022 Budapest	3 m mixed synchro
Silver medal – second place	2024 Doha	3 m mixed synchro
Bronze medal – third place	2023 Fukuoka	3 m mixed synchro
European Games
Gold medal – first place	2023 Kraków-Małopolska	3 m mixed synchro
European Championships
Gold medal – first place	2020 Budapest	3 m mixed synchro
Gold medal – first place	2026 Paris	Team event
Gold medal – first place	2026 Paris	3 m mixed synchro
Silver medal – second place	2024 Belgrade	1 m springboard
Silver medal – second place	2024 Belgrade	3 m springboard
Bronze medal – third place	2022 Rome	3 m mixed synchro
Bronze medal – third place	2026 Paris	3 m synchro
European Diving Championships
Gold medal – first place	2023 Rzeszów	3 m mixed synchro
Silver medal – second place	2025 Antalya	3 m mixed synchro
Bronze medal – third place	2025 Antalya	Team
World Junior Championships
Gold medal – first place	2021 Kyiv	3 m springboard B
Gold medal – first place	2021 Kyiv	mixed team
Gold medal – first place	2022 Montreal	1 m springboard
Gold medal – first place	2022 Montreal	3 m springboard
Gold medal – first place	2022 Montreal	3 m synchronised
European Junior Championships
Gold medal – first place	2022 Otopeni	1 m springboard
Gold medal – first place	2022 Otopeni	3 m springboard
Gold medal – first place	2022 Otopeni	3 m synchronised
Gold medal – first place	2022 Otopeni	mixed team

Matteo Santoro (born 9 October 2006) is an Italian diver. At the 2022 World Aquatics Championships, he won a silver medal in the 3 metre mixed synchronised springboard. At the LEN European Aquatics Championships, he won a gold medal in the 3 metre mixed synchronised springboard in 2021 at 14 years of age and a bronze medal in the same event in 2022 at 15 years of age. He is a five-time World Junior Championships gold medalist and a four-time European Junior Championships gold medalist.

== Background ==
Santoro was born 9 October 2006 in Rome and trains with Rome-based club M.R. Sport Fratelli Marconi, where he is coached by Domenico Rinaldi. He attended the Liceo Scientifico Sportivo (Scientific Sports High School) at the Acquacetosa sports complex in Rome. Since July 2024, he has been in a relationship with Spanish diver Max Liñán, which was publicly disclosed by Liñán on social media.

== Career ==
=== 2021 ===
==== 2020 European Aquatics Championships ====
2020 European Championships
Gold medal – first place	3 m mixed synchronised	300.69

At 14 years, 215 days of age, Santoro won his first medal at a senior international championships, winning the gold medal in the 3 metre mixed synchronised springboard with his partner Chiara Pellacani at the 2020 European Aquatics Championships, held in May 2021 at Danube Arena in Budapest, Hungary, with a final mark of 300.69 points.

==== 2021 World Junior Championships ====
Seven months later, in December in Kyiv, Ukraine for the 2021 FINA World Junior Diving Championships, Santoro started off with a gold medal in the mixed team event on day one, helping achieve the highest mark of 309.95 points. Two days later, on 4 December, he placed eighth in the 3 metre synchronised springboard final with his partner Matteo Cafiero and a score of 222.81 points. The same day, he earned a score of 367.15 points in the final of the 1 metre springboard for age group B to place eighth in the age group. For his final event, the 3 metre springboard on the sixth of seven days of competition, he won the gold medal for age group B with a score of 493.30 points and shared the podium with his 3-metre synchronised springboard partner, Matteo Cafiero, who won the bronze medal.

=== 2022 ===
==== 2022 World Aquatics Championships ====
2022 World Championships
Silver medal – second place	3 m mixed synchronised	293.55

For his first senior World Aquatics Championships, the 2022 World Aquatics Championships with diving contested in June in Budapest, Hungary when he was 15 years old, Santoro and his partner Chiara Pellacani won the silver medal in the 3 metre mixed synchronized springboard with a score of 293.55 points, which was 30.6 points behind the gold medal-winning duo representing China and 5.94 points ahead of the bronze medal-winning duo representing Great Britain. With his win at 15 years and 263 days of age, he became the youngest Italian diver to medal at a World Aquatics Championships.

==== 2022 European Junior Championships ====
In July, at the 2022 European Junior Diving Championships in Otopeni, Romania, Santoro won the gold medal in the 1 metre springboard with a score of 478.15, finishing 0.05 points ahead of silver medalist and fellow Italian Stefano Belotti. In the 3 metre springboard, he earned a score of 858.60 points in the final, winning the gold medal. For his two partner and team events, he won a gold medal in the 3 metre synchronised springboard with his partner Stefano Belotti and a score of 284.49 points as well as a gold medal in the mixed team event (termed jump event for the competition) where he and his three teammates (2 female and 1 male) achieved a final mark of 300.85 points.

==== 2022 European Aquatics Championships ====
2022 European Championships
Bronze medal – third place	3 m mixed synchronised	283.56

Returning to the European Aquatics Championships at the 2022 European Aquatics Championships, contested in his home county in Rome in August, Santoro competed in the 3 metre synchronised springboard with partner Chiara Pellacani, scoring 17.13 points less than their score from 2021 with a final mark of 283.56 points, which earned them the bronze medal 11.13 points behind gold medalists Lou Massenberg and Tina Punzel of Germany.

==== 2022 World Junior Championships ====
At the 2022 FINA World Junior Diving Championships, held starting 27 November in Montreal, Canada, Santoro placed thirteenth in his first event, the mixed team event, on day one, contributing to a final score of 269.80 points. Three days later, he scored 469.70 points in the final of the 1 metre springboard, finishing 16.1 points ahead of the second highest-scoring competitor, Jake Passmore of Ireland, and winning the gold medal. The following day, he won a gold medal in his second of two individual events, scoring highest in the final of the 3 metre springboard with 552.40 points. On the sixth day, he won a third gold medal in his fourth of four events, scoring 299.25 points with his partner Stefano Belotti in the final of the 3 metre synchronised springboard.

== International championships ==
Meet	1 m springboard	3 m springboard	3 m synchronised	3 m mixed synchronised	mixed team
Junior level
WJC 2021	8th (B) (367.15)	(gold) (B) (493.30)	8th (B) (222.81)	—N/a	(gold) (309.95)
EJC 2022	(gold) (478.15)	(gold) (585.60)	(gold) (284.49)	—N/a	(gold) (300.85)
WJC 2022	(gold) (469.70)	(gold) (552.40)	(gold) (299.25)	—N/a	13th (269.80)
Senior level
EC 2020				(gold) (300.69)	
WC 2022				(silver) (293.55)	
EC 2022				(bronze) (283.56)	
