= Diving at the 2024 European Aquatics Championships – Men's 1 m springboard =

Men's 1 m springboard at the 2024 European Aquatics Championships
- Venue: Serbian Institute for Sports and Sports Medicine
- Dates: 20 June
- Competitors: 25 from 16 nations
- Winning points: 250.25

Medalists
gold medal	Andrzej Rzeszutek	Poland
silver medal	Matteo Santoro	Italy
bronze medal	Stefano Belotti	Italy

The Men's 1 m springboard competition of the 2024 European Aquatics Championships was held on 20 June 2024.

== Results ==
The preliminary round was started at 10:00. The final was held at 17:15.

Green denotes finalists

Rank	Diver	Nationality	Preliminary		Final	
Rank	Diver	Nationality	Points	Rank	Points	Rank
1st place, gold medalist(s)	Andrzej Rzeszutek	Poland	326.80	5	394.40	1
2nd place, silver medalist(s)	Matteo Santoro	Italy	373.05	1	391.70	2
3rd place, bronze medalist(s)	Stefano Belotti	Italy	305.40	11	370.50	3
4	Kacper Lesiak	Poland	353.80	3	370.30	4
5	Stanislav Oliferchyk	Ukraine	307.35	10	350.85	5
6	Matthew Dixon	Great Britain	359.40	2	345.30	6
7	Matej Nevešćanin	Croatia	316.10	6	329.10	7
8	Bohdan Chyzhovskyi	Ukraine	300.15	12	325.85	8
9	Isak Børslien	Norway	330.90	4	324.45	9
10	Martynas Lisauskas	Lithuania	314.70	7	312.60	10
11	Nikolaj Schaller	Austria	309.15	9	279.05	11
12	Jonathan Schauer	Germany	309.20	8	264.15	12
13	Marko Huljev	Croatia	298.90	13	Did not advance	
14	Alexander Lube	Germany	294.05	14	Did not advance	
15	Hugo Thomas	Great Britain	285.55	15	Did not advance	
16	Elias Petersen	Sweden	282.95	16	Did not advance	
17	Jonas Madsen	Denmark	270.25	17	Did not advance	
18	Alexandru Avasiloae	Romania	264.20	18	Did not advance	
19	Tornike Onikashvili	Georgia	260.50	19	Did not advance	
20	Dariush Lotfi	Austria	254.90	20	Did not advance	
21	Juan Pablo Cortes	Spain	245.85	21	Did not advance	
22	Sebastian Konecki	Lithuania	244.15	22	Did not advance	
23	Theofilos Afthinos	Greece	235.95	23	Did not advance	
24	Irakli Sakandelidze	Georgia	222.15	24	Did not advance	
25	Nikola Paraušić	Serbia	216.35	25	Did not advance	
