= 2023 European Diving Championships – Men's 10 metre platform =

Men's 10 metre platform at the 2023 European Diving Championships
- Venue: Rzeszów Diving Arena
- Date: 27 June
- Competitors: 16 from 12 nations
- Winning points: 435.40

Medalists
gold medal	Timo Barthel	Germany
silver medal	Robbie Lee	Great Britain
bronze medal	Riccardo Giovannini	Italy

The men's 10 metre platform event at the 2023 European Diving Championships was held on 27 June 2023.

== Results ==
The preliminary round was started at 10:00. The final was held at 18:00.

Green denotes finalists

Rank	Diver	Nationality	Preliminary		Final	
Rank	Diver	Nationality	Points	Rank	Points	Rank
1st place, gold medalist(s)	Timo Barthel	Germany	434.15	1	435.40	1
2nd place, silver medalist(s)	Robbie Lee	Great Britain	424.35	2	413.20	2
3rd place, bronze medalist(s)	Riccardo Giovannini	Italy	391.05	3	411.20	3
4	Ben Cutmore	Great Britain	373.35	6	410.75	4
5	Constantin Popovici	Romania	335.00	12	398.80	5
6	Anton Knoll	Austria	341.55	11	379.40	6
7	Carlos Camacho	Spain	374.65	5	368.20	7
8	Eduard Timbretti Gugiu	Italy	354.45	10	366.75	8
9	Jaden Eikermann	Germany	365.65	9	365.75	9
10	Isak Børslien	Norway	366.90	8	355.80	10
11	Robert Łukaszewicz	Poland	369.50	7	336.45	11
12	Yevhen Naumenko	Ukraine	383.15	4	324.80	12
13	Athanasios Tsirikos	Greece	316.05	13	Did not advance	
14	Filip Jachim	Poland	281.25	14	Did not advance	
15	Marat Grigoryan	Armenia	253.40	15	Did not advance	
16	Tsvetomir Ereminov	Bulgaria	241.05	16	Did not advance	
