= Diving at the 2024 European Aquatics Championships – Men's 10 m platform =

Men's 10 m platform at the 2024 European Aquatics Championships
- Venue: Serbian Institute for Sports and Sports Medicine
- Dates: 23 June
- Competitors: 16 from 10 nations
- Winning points: 489.45

Medalists
gold medal	Robbie Lee	Great Britain
silver medal	Carlos Camacho del Hoyo	Spain
silver medal	Ben Cutmore	Great Britain

The Men's 10 m platform competition of the 2024 European Aquatics Championships was held on 23 June 2024.

== Results ==
The preliminary round was started at 10:00. The final was held at 17:00.

Green denotes finalists

Rank	Diver	Nationality	Preliminary		Final	
Rank	Diver	Nationality	Points	Rank	Points	Rank
1st place, gold medalist(s)	Robbie Lee	Great Britain	414.80	3	489.45	1
2nd place, silver medalist(s)	Carlos Camacho del Hoyo	Spain	370.90	5	432.70	2
2nd place, silver medalist(s)	Ben Cutmore	Great Britain	419.95	2	429.90	3
4	Danylo Avanesov	Ukraine	429.95	1	412.35	4
5	Marko Barsukov	Ukraine	312.30	12	406.00	5
6	Jorge Rodríguez Ledesma	Spain	389.45	4	399.40	6
7	Espen Prenzyna	Germany	333.75	8	395.55	7
8	Isak Børslien	Norway	322.10	10	385.25	8
9	Dariush Lotfi	Austria	356.35	6	373.95	9
10	Anton Knoll	Austria	312.95	11	357.30	10
11	Francesco Casalini	Italy	351.60	7	327.40	11
12	Aleksa Teofilović	Serbia	324.60	9	320.00	12
13	Robert Lukaszewicz	Poland	258.55	13	Did not advance	
14	Julian Verzotto	Italy	251.85	14	Did not advance	
15	Richard Roop-Iliste	Sweden	232.80	15	Did not advance	
	Luis Avila Sanchez	Germany	Withdrew			
