= High diving at the 2022 European Aquatics Championships – Men =

Men at the 2022 European Aquatics Championships
- Venue: Foro Italico
- Dates: 18, 19, 20 August
- Competitors: 18 from 10 nations
- Winning points: 455.70

Medalists
gold medal	Constantin Popovici	Romania
silver medal	Cătălin Preda	Romania
bronze medal	Alessandro De Rose	Italy

The Men competition of the high diving events at the 2022 European Aquatics Championships was held on 18, 19 and 20 August 2022.

It marked the first time a men's high diving event was conducted at a LEN European Aquatics Championships. Competition was contested from a 27 metre platform.

== Results ==
The first round was held on 18 August at 18:15. The second round will be held on 19 August at 18:15. The last two rounds were started on 20 August at 18:00.

Rank	Diver	Nationality	Round 1	Round 2	Round 3	Round 4	Total
1st place, gold medalist(s)	Constantin Popovici	Romania	75.60	130.50	102.60	147.00	455.70
2nd place, silver medalist(s)	Cătălin Preda	Romania	82.60	135.20	106.20	112.20	436.20
3rd place, bronze medalist(s)	Alessandro De Rose	Italy	75.60	117.30	99.00	124.55	416.45
4	Gary Hunt	France	81.20	124.95	104.40	91.00	401.55
5	Oleksiy Pryhorov	Ukraine	72.80	127.50	86.40	108.00	394.70
6	Aidan Heslop	Great Britain	72.80	140.40	77.40	102.30	392.90
7	Carlos Gimeno Martínez	Spain	65.80	93.60	90.00	127.20	376.60
8	Michal Navrátil	Czech Republic	70.00	101.05	91.80	110.45	373.30
9	Andrea Barnaba	Italy	75.60	88.40	83.70	102.60	350.30
10	Alberto Devora	Spain	54.60	89.30	50.40	94.30	288.60
11	Owen Weymouth	Great Britain	64.40	105.60	55.80	59.80	285.60
12	Matthias Appenzeller	Switzerland	54.60	92.00	50.40	83.85	280.85
13	Manuel Halbish	Germany	63.00	80.50	48.60	79.80	271.90
14	Davide Baraldi	Italy	57.40	72.85	53.65	79.05	262.95
15	Jean-David Duval	Switzerland	32.20	67.65	77.40	84.05	261.30
16	Robin Georges	France	39.20	73.80	81.00	58.05	252.05
17	Jonas Madsen	Denmark	51.80	61.20	65.10	51.15	229.25
18	Jan Wermelinger	Switzerland	39.20	38.00	51.15	68.40	196.75
