= High diving at the 2026 European Aquatics Championships – Men =

Men's 20 m platform at the 2026 European Aquatics Championships
- Venue: Pont de Bir-Hakeim
- Dates: 7 August (Round 1–2); 8 August (Round 3–4)
- Competitors: 14 from 11 nations
- Winning points: 411.60

Medalists
gold medal	Cătălin Preda	Romania
silver medal	Andrea Barnabà	Italy
bronze medal	Gary Hunt	France

The Men's 20 m platform competition at the 2026 European Aquatics Championships will be held on 7 and 8 August 2026.

== Results ==
Rank	Diver	Nationality	R1	R2	R3	R4	Total
1st place, gold medalist(s)	Cătălin Preda	Romania	66.30	111.30	88.40	145.60	411.60
2nd place, silver medalist(s)	Andrea Barnabà	Italy	66.30	118.80	83.30	117.60	386.00
3rd place, bronze medalist(s)	Gary Hunt	France	63.70	110.00	88.40	132.30	382.50
4	Carlos Gimeno	Spain	61.10	122.50	85.00	110.25	378.85
5	Davide Baraldi	Italy	61.10	105.00	71.40	112.70	350.20
6	Pierrick Schafer	Switzerland	63.70	87.40	88.40	89.30	328.80
7	Constantin Popovici	Romania	66.30	112.70	78.20	68.20	325.40
8	Manuel Halbisch	Germany	48.10	74.00	73.10	64.35	259.55
9	Sebas van Baarsen	Netherlands	57.20	70.30	57.80	71.40	256.70
10	Jean-David Duval	Switzerland	46.80	67.65	66.30	51.60	232.35
11	Lander Roels	Belgium	40.30	44.85	62.90	64.35	212.40
12	Pavel Istomin	Neutral Athletes B	46.80	35.65	54.25	67.20	203.90
13	Frederik Dalgaard	Denmark	29.90	57.00	49.30	51.60	187.80
14	Viktor Dobra	Hungary	33.80	40.60	43.50	6.20	124.10
