= High diving at the 2019 World Aquatics Championships – Men =

Men at the 2019 World Aquatics Championships
- Venue: Chosun University Football Field
- Location: Gwangju, South Korea
- Dates: 22–24 July
- Competitors: 22 from 12 nations
- Winning time: 442.20

Medalists
gold medal	Gary Hunt	Great Britain
silver medal	Steven LoBue	United States
bronze medal	Jonathan Paredes	Mexico

The Men competition at the 2019 World Aquatics Championships was held on 22 and 24 July 2019.

== Results ==
The first two rounds were held on 22 July at 14:00. The last two rounds were held on 24 July at 12:00.

Rank	Diver	Nationality	Round 1	Round 2	Round 3	Round 4	Total
1st place, gold medalist(s)	Gary Hunt	Great Britain	71.40	117.60	97.20	156.00	442.20
2nd place, silver medalist(s)	Steven LoBue	United States	75.60	142.80	95.40	119.85	433.65
3rd place, bronze medalist(s)	Jonathan Paredes	Mexico	75.60	133.95	91.80	128.80	430.15
4	Michal Navrátil	Czech Republic	74.20	119.85	90.00	96.75	380.80
5	Alessandro De Rose	Italy	70.00	117.50	81.00	110.40	378.90
6	Andy Jones	United States	71.40	108.10	81.00	105.35	365.85
7	Miguel García	Colombia	63.00	96.60	91.80	114.40	365.80
8	Viacheslav Kolesnikov	Ukraine	61.60	105.60	88.40	102.50	358.10
9	Orlando Duque	Colombia	67.20	103.50	81.00	103.50	355.20
10	David Colturi	United States	63.00	91.00	90.00	99.90	343.90
11	Sergio Guzmán	Mexico	67.20	101.05	88.20	72.00	328.45
12	Nikita Fedotov	Russia	67.20	103.20	86.40	70.95	327.75
13	Alain Kohl	Luxembourg	54.60	98.90	82.80	did not advance	236.30
14	Cătălin Preda	Romania	75.60	83.20	75.60	did not advance	234.40
15	Oleksiy Pryhorov	Ukraine	46.20	108.00	79.20	did not advance	233.40
16	Owen Weymouth	Great Britain	68.60	99.00	64.80	did not advance	232.40
17	Artem Silchenko	Russia	67.20	76.85	86.40	did not advance	230.45
18	Kris Kolanus	Poland	67.20	75.20	82.80	did not advance	225.20
19	Diego Rivero	Mexico	51.80	92.25	75.60	did not advance	219.65
20	Blake Aldridge	Great Britain	61.60	91.65	63.00	did not advance	216.25
21	Matthias Appenzeller	Switzerland	53.20	73.10	64.80	did not advance	191.10
22	Igor Semashko	Russia	50.40	47.70	86.40	did not advance	184.50
