= Cătălin Preda =

Romanian diver (born 1991)

Personal information
- Full name: Cătălin-Petru Preda
- Nationality: Romanian
- Born: 29 June 1991 (age 35) Bucharest, Romania
- Height: 1.72 m (5 ft 8 in)
- Weight: 67 kg (148 lb)

Sport
- Country: Romania
- Sport: Diving, high diving
- Event: 27-metre
Medal record
Men's high diving
Representing Romania
Event	1st	2nd	3rd
World Championships	0	1	1
European Championships	1	1	0
FINA Aquatics Festival	0	1	0
Total	1	3	1
World Championships
Silver medal – second place	2023 Fukuoka	Men
Bronze medal – third place	2024 Doha	Men
European Championships
Gold medal – first place	2026 Paris	Men
Silver medal – second place	2022 Rome	Men
FINA Aquatics Festival
Silver medal – second place	2021 Abu Dhabi	27 m high dive

Cătălin-Petru Preda (born 29 June 1991) is a Romanian diver and high diver. He was the first man to win a silver medal in a high diving event at a LEN European Aquatics Championships, winning the silver medal in the 27-metre high dive at the 2022 European Aquatics Championships. He formerly served as a judge on reality television show Splash! Vedete la Apă.

== Background ==
Preda started competitive diving when he was 7 years old, attended Coventry University in England for college, where he majored in journalism and media, and served as a judge on the reality television show Splash! Vedete la Apă, where professional divers taught celebrities diving.

== Career ==
=== 2019–2021 ===
On 14 July, at the stop of the 2019 Red Bull Cliff Diving World Series held in Beirut, Lebanon, Preda won the bronze medal with a score of 322.75 points, which was less than 50 points behind gold medalist Gary Hunt of Great Britain and less than 10 points behind silver medalist David Colturi of the United States. At the 2019 World Aquatics Championships, held later in July in Gwangju, South Korea, he competed in the 27-metre high dive, scoring a total of 234.40 points to place fourteenth overall.

A little over two years later, in June 2021 and following a disrupted competition calendar due to the COVID-19 pandemic, Preda achieved his first win at a Red Bull Cliff Diving World Series stop, winning the gold medal at the stop in Saint-Raphaël, France. By the conclusion of the 2021 Red Bull Cliff Diving World Series, he had achieved an overall third-place standing across all stops of the World Series, earning his first assignment as a permanent diver in a Red Bull Cliff Diving World Series for the 2022 World Series. In December the same year, he won the silver medal in the 27-metre high dive at the Abu Dhabi Aquatics Festival, held in Abu Dhabi, United Arab Emirates, with a score of 433.55 points, finishing 3.35 points behind gold medalist Aidan Heslop of Great Britain and 1.55 points ahead of fellow Romanian and bronze medalist Constantin Popovici.

=== 2022 ===
==== 2022 World Series beginning ====
At the stop of the 2022 Red Bull Cliff Diving World Series held in June in Paris, France, Preda won the gold medal with a score of 470.50 points. His score ranked as the highest ever achieved at a single Red Bull Cliff Diving World Series stop, setting a new record. By the end of competition at the World Series stop held in August in Oslo, Norway, he had earned a total of 600 ranking points across the first four stops of the World Series circuit, ranking as the overall number one male competitor, 30 points ahead of second-ranked Gary Hunt and 84 points ahead of third-ranked Aidan Heslop.

==== 2022 European Aquatics Championships ====
For the 2022 European Aquatics Championships, held in August in Rome, Italy, event organizers added high diving to the program for the first time in the history of the LEN European Aquatics Championships, with men competing from a height of 27 metres. At the end of the first round of competition on 18 August, he ranked first with a score of 82.60 points, 1.40 points ahead of Gary Hunt. The following day, he brought his total score up to 217.80, ranking first by 5.60 points at the end of the second round of competition. On the third and final day, 20 August, he earned an additional 218.40 points over the third and fourth rounds of competition for a total score of 436.20 points, which was 19.50 points behind Constantin Popovici and 19.75 points ahead of Alessandro De Rose of Italy and earned him the first silver medal in a male high diving event at a LEN European Aquatics Championships.

==== 2022 World Series conclusion ====
Following his performances at the European Championships, Preda continued on the Red Bull Cliff Diving World Series circuit at the stop held on 27 August in Mostar, Bosnia and Herzegovina, where he retained his overall first-rank amongst male competitors across all stops of the circuit with a score of 760 points and his record of 470.50 points from the Paris stop of the circuit was broken by Constantin Popovici who scored 481.50 points. On 11 September, at the World Series stop in Sisikon, Switzerland, he placed fourth and retained his overall first-rank. One week later, on 18 September at the World Series stop in Polignano a Mare, Italy, he won the bronze medal with a score of 427.20 points, increased his overall score to 1000 points, and dropped in rankings to third overall. In October, at the World Series stop contested in Sydney, he won the bronze medal.

== International championships ==
Meet	27-metre high dive
WC 2019	14th (234.40)
ADAF 2021	(silver) (433.55)
EC 2022	(silver) (436.20)

== Awards and honours ==
- LEN, High Diver of the Year (men's), nominee: 2022
