= Jake Passmore =

Irish diver (born 2005)

Personal information
- Born: 12 June 2005 (age 21) Ireland

Sport
- Country: (Republic of Ireland) Ireland
- Sport: Diving
- Events: 1 m springboard, 3 m springboard
- College team: (United States) Miami Hurricanes
- Club: City of Leeds; Esprit Diving Club (former)
- Coached by: Dario di Fazio
Medal record
Men's diving
Representing Ireland
Event	1st	2nd	3rd
World Junior Championships	0	1	0
European Junior Championships	0	0	1
Total	0	1	1
World Junior Championships
Silver medal – second place	2022 Montreal	1 m springboard
European Junior Championships
Bronze medal – third place	2022 Otopeni	1 m springboard

Jake Passmore (born 12 June 2005) is an Irish diver. In 2022, he became the first diver representing Ireland to win a medal at a World Junior Diving Championships, winning the silver medal in the 1 metre springboard at the 2022 World Junior Diving Championships. He was also the first diver representing Ireland to win a medal at a European Junior Diving Championships, winning the bronze medal at the 2022 European Junior Diving Championships in the 1 metre springboard. In June 2024 Passmore Qualified for The Paris 2024 Olympics in the 3m Springboard finishing 21st

== Background ==
Passmore was born 12 June 2005. For his diving training he is based in Leeds, England as part of the City of Leeds club. He formerly dove with Esprit Diving Club, based in Bradford, England.

== Career ==
=== Early career ===
As a nine-year-old at the 2014 Open National Diving Championships in Dublin, Passmore won the 1 metre springboard and 3 metre springboard for the age group above his, after he was allowed to compete one age group up. The following year, he won the silver medal in the 10 metre platform, the gold medal in the 1 metre springboard and the gold medal in the 3 metre springboard for the same age group, only this time competing as a ten-year-old.

=== 2022 ===
At the first Futures Cup, the 2022 Futures Cup held in May in Plymouth, England, Passmore won the bronze medal in the 3 metre springboard with a score of 355.75 points, which was over 100 points behind gold medalist Yona Knight-Wisdom of Jamaica. In July, he started his competition at the 2022 European Junior Diving Championships off with a bronze medal in the 1 metre springboard, achieving a final score of 455.00 points. His bronze medal marked the first medal won by a diver representing Ireland at a European Junior Diving Championships. Two days later, he concluded competing at the Championships with a fifth-place finish in the 3 metre springboard, where he earned a final score of 502.05 points, which was 83.55 points behind the gold medalist Matteo Santoro of Italy.

==== 2022 World Junior Championships ====
For the 1 metre springboard at the 2022 World Junior Diving Championships, held starting in November in Montreal, Canada, Passmore scored a total of 453.60 points, winning the silver medal only 16.10 points behind gold medalist Matteo Santoro. His medal was the first of any rank won by a diver representing Ireland at a World Junior Diving Championships. The following day, he ranked first in the preliminaries of the 3 metre springboard with a score of 529.65 points and qualified for the final. In the evening, he achieved a final mark of 508.35 and place fifth, which was less than four points behind the bronze medalist.

=== 2023 ===
In the final of the 3 metre springboard at the 2023 British National Diving Cup in February, Passmore placed eighth with a score of 354.90 points, which was 162.65 points behind gold medalist Jack Laugher.

=== 2024 ===
Jake competed at the 2024 Summer Olympics in Paris in the 3m Springboard finishing in 21st out of 24 divers.

== International championships ==
Meet	1m springboard	3m springboard
EJC 2022	(bronze) (455.00)	5th (502.05)
WJC 2022	(silver) (453.60)	5th (508.35)
WC 2023	17th (344.60)	45th (319.65)
WC 2024	—	17th (364.50)
OLY 2024	—	21st (360.90)
WC 2025	—	27th (360.60)
EC 2026	16th (303.15)	17th (350.85)

=== Synchronized ===
Meet	Event	Partner	Result
WC 2023	Mixed 3m springboard	Clare Cryan	15th (237.18)
WC 2024	Mixed 3m springboard	Clare Cryan	12th (249.12)
