= Robbie Lee (diver) =

British diver (born 2005)

Personal information
- Full name: Robbie Scott Lee
- Born: 2 January 2005 (age 21) London, England
Medal record
Men's diving
Representing Great Britain
European Games
Silver medal – second place	2023 Kraków-Małopolska	10 m platform
European Championships
Gold medal – first place	2024 Belgrade	10 m platform
European Diving Championships
Silver medal – second place	2023 Rzeszow	10 m platform

Robbie Scott Lee (born 2 January 2005) is a British athlete who competes in diving. He won a silver medal in the 10m platform event at the 2023 European Games. Lee competed in the 2024 European Aquatics Championships for GB and won a gold medal

Lee attended Barton Peveril Sixth Form College in Eastleigh, Hampshire.

== Awards ==
European Games
Year	Place	Medal	Event	Ref.
2023	Rzeszów (Poland)	Silver	10m platform	
FINA World Junior Diving Championships
Year	Place	Medal	Event	Ref.
2022	Montreal (Canada)	Silver	10m platform A/B (with Euan McCabe)	
European Junior Swimming Championships
Year	Place	Medal	Event	Ref.
2022	Otopeni (Romania)	Gold	Synchronised platform (with Euan McCabe)	
