= Diving at the 2024 European Aquatics Championships – Men's 10 m synchro platform =

Men's 10 m synchro platform at the 2024 European Aquatics Championships
- Venue: Serbian Institute For Sports And Sports Medicine
- Dates: 21 June
- Competitors: 16 from 8 nations
- Winning points: 367.05

Medalists
gold medal	Anton Knoll; Dariush Lotfi	Austria
silver medal	Francesco Casalini; Julian Verzotto	Italy
bronze medal	Ben Cutmore; Euan McCabe	Great Britain

The Men's 10 m synchro platform competition of the 2024 European Aquatics Championships was held on 21 June 2024.

== Results ==
The final was started at 15:30.

Rank	Nation	Divers	Points						
Rank	Nation	Divers	T1	T2	T3	T4	T5	T6	Total
1st place, gold medalist(s)	Austria	Anton Knoll; Dariush Lotfi	45.00	44.40	66.24	70.20	66.33	74.88	367.05
2nd place, silver medalist(s)	Italy	Francesco Casalini; Julian Verzotto	48.00	45.00	68.16	61.20	67.32	67.20	356.88
3rd place, bronze medalist(s)	Great Britain	Ben Cutmore; Euan McCabe	48.60	51.00	54.72	64.26	68.40	63.72	350.70
4	Spain	Carlos Camacho del Hoyo; Max Liñan Canela	50.40	43.80	70.20	42.57	72.00	71.04	350.01
5	Ukraine	Kirill Boliukh; Mark Hrytsenko	44.40	48.00	76.50	73.92	34.41	72.00	349.23
6	Germany	Luis Avila Sanchez; Tom Waldsteiner	45.60	46.80	69.12	70.08	46.44	64.80	342.84
7	France	Gary Hunt; Loïs Szymczak	44.40	48.60	56.70	50.49	56.64	48.72	305.55
8	Armenia	Arman Enokyan; Marat Grigoryan	37.80	36.00	40.32	53.10	53.07	51.84	272.13
