= High diving at the 2023 World Aquatics Championships – Men =

Men's high diving at the 2023 World Aquatics Championships
- Venue: Seaside Momochi Beach Park
- Location: Fukuoka, Japan
- Dates: 25 July (round 1–2); 27 July (round 3–4)
- Competitors: 23 from 15 nations
- Winning points: 472.80

Medalists
| gold medal | Constantin Popovici | Romania |
| silver medal | Cătălin Preda | Romania |
| bronze medal | Gary Hunt | France |

The men's high diving competition at the 2023 World Aquatics Championships was held on 25 and 27 July 2023.

== Results ==
The first two rounds started on 25 July at 14:00. The third round was held on 27 July at 12:00 and the last round at 12:55.

| Rank | Diver | Nationality | Round 1 | Round 2 | Round 3 | Round 4 | Total |
|---|---|---|---|---|---|---|---|
| 1st place, gold medalist(s) | Constantin Popovici | Romania | 75.60 | 156.60 | 84.60 | 156.00 | 472.80 |
| 2nd place, silver medalist(s) | Cătălin Preda | Romania | 67.20 | 140.40 | 100.80 | 130.05 | 438.45 |
| 3rd place, bronze medalist(s) | Gary Hunt | France | 57.40 | 132.30 | 93.60 | 143.00 | 426.30 |
| 4 | Oleksiy Pryhorov | Ukraine | 67.20 | 130.05 | 93.60 | 132.30 | 423.15 |
| 5 | Aidan Heslop | Great Britain | 74.20 | 79.65 | 91.80 | 167.40 | 413.05 |
| 6 | Carlos Gimeno | Spain | 75.60 | 117.60 | 75.60 | 127.20 | 396.00 |
| 7 | James Lichtenstein | United States | 50.40 | 131.60 | 81.00 | 127.20 | 390.20 |
| 8 | Miguel García | Colombia | 71.40 | 117.30 | 82.80 | 102.90 | 374.40 |
| 9 | Matt Cooper | United States | 58.80 | 124.95 | 77.40 | 102.00 | 363.15 |
| 10 | Sergio Guzmán | Mexico | 67.20 | 112.50 | 72.00 | 109.65 | 361.35 |
| 11 | Jonathan Paredes | Mexico | 60.20 | 117.30 | 81.00 | 94.00 | 352.50 |
| 12 | David Colturi | United States | 72.80 | 98.90 | 57.60 | 119.60 | 348.90 |
| 13 | Davide Baraldi | Italy | 51.80 | 98.40 | 66.60 | 104.55 | 321.35 |
| 14 | Matthias Appenzeller | Switzerland | 60.20 | 102.90 | 64.80 | 87.40 | 315.30 |
| 15 | Andrea Barnaba | Italy | 57.40 | 88.15 | 68.40 | 94.30 | 308.25 |
| 16 | Yolotl Martínez | Mexico | 46.20 | 92.00 | 66.60 | 86.10 | 290.90 |
| 17 | Braden Rumpit | New Zealand | 46.20 | 83.60 | 61.20 | 78.20 | 269.20 |
| 18 | Manuel Halbisch | Germany | 46.20 | 66.60 | 62.90 | 70.30 | 246.00 |
| 19 | Michael Foisy | Canada | 28.00 | 85.80 | 61.20 | 61.50 | 236.50 |
| 20 | Kyohei Arata | Japan | 33.60 | 68.40 | 61.20 | 59.45 | 222.65 |
| 21 | Jean-David Duval | Switzerland | 30.80 | 73.80 | 56.10 | 61.50 | 222.20 |
| 22 | Víctor Ortega | Colombia | 42.00 | 79.80 | 56.10 | 43.05 | 220.95 |
| 23 | Choi Byung-hwa | South Korea | 36.40 | 38.00 | 56.10 | 57.00 | 187.50 |
