= Kyrylo Azarov =

Ukrainian diver (born 2007)

Personal information
- Native name: Кирило Валерійович Азаров
- Full name: Kyrylo Valeriyovych Azarov
- Born: 14 December 2007 (age 18) Kyiv, Ukraine

Sport
- Country: Ukraine
- Sport: Diving
Medal record
Men's diving
Representing Ukraine
Event	1st	2nd	3rd
World Junior Championships	1	0	1
European Junior Championships	5	3	1
Total	6	3	2
World Junior Championships
Gold medal – first place	2022 Montréal	1 m springboard
Bronze medal – third place	2024 Rio de Janeiro	Mixed team event
European Junior Championships
Gold medal – first place	2022 Otopeni	1 m springboard
Gold medal – first place	2022 Otopeni	3 m springboard
Gold medal – first place	2023 Rijeka	Mixed team event
Gold medal – first place	2023 Rijeka	3 m synchro
Gold medal – first place	2025 Athens	1 m springboard
Silver medal – second place	2024 Rzeszów	Mixed team event
Silver medal – second place	2024 Rzeszów	3 m springboard
Silver medal – second place	2024 Rzeszów	3 m synchro
Bronze medal – third place	2023 Rijeka	3 m springboard

Kyrylo Valeriyovych Azarov (Ukrainian: Кирило Валерійович Азаров, born 14 December 2007 in Kyiv) is a Ukrainian diver.

In 2022, Kyrylo won two gold medals in springboard events at the 2022 European Junior Swimming Championships held in Otopeni, one in the 1m and on in the 3m. The same year, he also won a gold medal in the 1 m springboard event at the 2022 World Junior Championships in Montréal.

The following years, he competed at the 2023 European Junior Diving Championships in Rijeka, where he received gold medals in the mixed team and 3m synchronized springboard events, as well as a bronze medal in the 3m springboard event.

At the 2024 European Junior Diving Championships, held in Rzeszów, Azarov won three silver medals in the 3 m synchro and 3 m springboard events, and also in the mixed team.

He is currently dating with an artistic swimmer Anastasiia Shmonina.
