= Alessandro De Rose =

Italian high diver (born 1992)

Personal information
- Born: 2 July 1992 (age 33) Cosenza

Sport
- Sport: Diving
- Event: High diving
Medal record
World Championships
Bronze medal – third place	2017 Budapest	Men
European Championships
Bronze medal – third place	2022 Rome	27 m high dive

Alessandro De Rose (born 2 July 1992) is an Italian high diver.

De Rose was born in Cosenza, Italy. He competed for Italy at the 2015 World Aquatics Championships in Kazan.

On 23 July 2017 De Rose won the men's title at Italian stop of the Red Bull Cliff Diving World Series which was held at Polignano a Mare in Puglia.

In December 2021, at the Abu Dhabi Aquatics Festival, held in Abu Dhabi, United Arab Emirates, De Rose placed sixth in the 27 metre high dive with a score of 398.45 points.

At the 2022 European Aquatics Championships, held in Rome in August, De Rose won the bronze medal in the high dive event (27 metre), with a score of 416.45 points, which was 39.25 points behind the score of 455.70 points by gold medalist Constantin Popovici of Romania, 19.75 points behind silver medalist Cătălin Preda of Romania, and 14.90 points ahead of fourth-place finisher Gary Hunt of France.
