= Randy Dickison =

American diver (died 1996)

Personal information
- Born: Minneapolis, United States
- Died: 1996 Belgium

Sport
- Sport: Diving

Randy Dickison (died 1996) was a high diver who made attempts at the world record high dive.

Dickison attended Phillips Junior High School in Minneapolis, Minnesota with fellow future high diver Dana Kunze. In 1982 he executed a 30 m (98 ft) dive and landed head first. He attempted 4 world records for highest dives from 51.5 m (169 ft), 51.8 m (170 ft), 52.4 m (172 ft), and 53 metres (173 feet 11 inches). He attempted to set the high diving world record in 1985 with a 174 feet 8 inches (53.24 m) dive at Ocean Park Hong Kong, but fractured multiple bones of his left leg in the attempt.

Dickison died during a stunt dive into a giant sponge in Belgium in 1996.
