= Joshua Hedberg =

American diver (born 2007)

Personal information
- Nationality: American
- Born: January 29, 2007 (age 19) Rockford, Illinois, U.S.

Sport
- Country: United States
- Sport: Diving
- Event(s): 10 m platform, 10 m synchro
Medal record
Men's diving
Representing the United States
World Championships
Bronze medal – third place	2025 Singapore	10 m synchro
World Junior Championships
Gold medal – first place	2022 Montréal	Mixed team
Bronze medal – third place	2022 Montréal	10 m platform
Bronze medal – third place	2022 Montréal	10 m synchro

Joshua Hedberg (born January 29, 2007) is an American diver.

== Early life and education ==
Hedberg was born to Alina and Mark Hedberg in Rockford, Illinois and grew up in Belvidere, Illinois. He moved to Noblesville, Indiana at 11 years old to focus on his diving training.

On November 5, 2024, Hedberg committed to Indiana University and joined the diving team in the fall of 2025. He was ranked the No. 1 recruit in the class of 2025.

== Career ==
Hedberg made his World Aquatics Championships debut in 2022, where he became the youngest U.S. male diver to qualify for the World Championship. He competed in the 10 metre platform event and finished in 11th place with a score of 375.10..

In February 2024, he competed at the 2024 World Aquatics Championships in the 10 metre synchro event and finished in 14th place with a score of 324.51. In November 2024, he competed at the 2024 World Aquatics Junior Diving Championships and won a gold medal in the mixed team event with a score of 361.50, and a bronze medal in the platform event with a score of 528.70.

In July 2025, he competed at the 2025 World Aquatics Championships and won a bronze medal in the 10 metre synchro event, along with Carson Tyler, with a score of 410.70. This was team USA's first medal in the event since David Boudia and Thomas Finchum won silver in 2009.
