= Diving at the 2020 European Aquatics Championships – Mixed 3 m springboard synchro =

Mixed 3 m springboard synchro at the 2020 European Aquatics Championships
- Venue: Danube Arena
- Dates: 12 May 2021
- Competitors: 12 from 6 nations
- Teams: 6
- Winning points: 300.69

Medalists
gold medal	Chiara Pellacani; Matteo Santoro	Italy
silver medal	Tina Punzel; Lou Massenberg	Germany
bronze medal	Vitaliia Koroleva; Ilia Molchanov	Russia

The mixed 3 m springboard synchro competition of the 2020 European Aquatics Championships was held on 12 May 2021.

== Results ==
The final was started at 19:30.

Rank	Nation	Divers	Points					
Rank	Nation	Divers	T1	T2	T3	T4	T5	Total
1st place, gold medalist(s)	Italy	Chiara Pellacani; Matteo Santoro	49.80	46.20	64.80	67.89	72.00	300.69
2nd place, silver medalist(s)	Germany	Tina Punzel; Lou Massenberg	48.00	49.80	64.80	64.17	67.50	294.27
3rd place, bronze medalist(s)	Russia	Vitaliia Koroleva; Ilia Molchanov	49.20	46.80	69.30	62.10	62.10	289.50
4	Ukraine	Viktoriya Kesar; Stanislav Oliferchyk	47.40	43.80	68.40	65.70	63.24	288.54
5	Great Britain	Yasmin Harper; Ross Haslam	49.80	46.80	63.90	58.50	60.45	279.45
6	Sweden	Emilia Nilsson Garip; David Ekdahl	42.60	37.20	60.30	62.10	62.31	264.51
