= Abu Dhabi Aquatics Festival =

- Date: 15 – 20 December 2021

The Abu Dhabi Aquatics Festival was a FINA-organized international aquatics competition spanning the disciplines of open water swimming, diving, and high diving, which took place from 15 to 20 December 2021 on Yas Island in Abu Dhabi, United Arab Emirates. It was held correspondent to the 2021 FINA World Short Course Swimming Championships. The festival was the first time competitions in the three disciplines are being conducted at the same time as and in conjunction with a FINA World Short Course Swimming Championships. In addition to sporting competitions, an interactive village is being provided for festival attendees. Coverage of the aquatics festival on television and via online streaming was provided on six continents with news agencies including ESPN (Americas), SuperSport (Africa), and beIN Sports (Asia) providing international coverage of the high diving competitions.

A press conference to welcome athletes and attendees following the 4×1500 metre relay open water swimming event on 15 December served as the official start of the festival. The second day of the festival, Sheikh Nahyan bin Zayed Al Nahyan of the House of Nahyan attended the festival and the opening ceremony of the 2021 World Swimming Championships to express his support of the athletes and the importance of the global events in the sustainable growth and development of local sports culture. On 17 December, FINA hosted an aquatics gala where it announced the recipients of its annual FINA Athletes of the Year and Coaches of the Year awards. Approximately 200 athletes competed in the events held as part of the festival.

The second edition of the Aquatics Festival was announced in February 2023, with a change of location to multiple venues in Egypt and rotating the sports included to water polo, open water swimming (part of the 2023 FINA Open Water Tour), and artistic swimming.

== Open water swimming ==
Open water swimming competitions took place in Yas Bay as part the grand finale of the 2021 FINA Marathon Swim World Series from 15 to 16 December 2021. In addition to the standard 10 kilometre open water marathon events held in the World Series on 16 December, FINA debuted a mixed gender 4×1500 metre relay event on 15 December. It was the first time the relay event was held at any FINA competition.

Event	Gold		Silver		Bronze	
Men 10 km marathon	Florian Wellbrock; Germany	1:48:09.4	Domenico Acerenza; Italy	1:48:12.0	Kristóf Rasovszky; Hungary	1:48:23.6
Women 10 km marathon	Leonie Beck; Germany	1:58:17.0	Ana Marcela Cunha; Brazil	1:58:19.3	Sharon van Rouwendaal; Netherlands	1:58:22.10
Mixed 4×1500 m relay	Italy; Martina De Memme (17:23.80); Giulia Gabbrielleschi (17:24.70); Domenico Acerenza (16:10.60); Gregorio Paltrinieri (15:50.00)	1:06:49.10	Hungary; Réka Rohács (17:21.10); Anna Olasz (17:29.50); Dávid Betlehem (16:07.90); Kristóf Rasovszky (15:53.20)	1:06:51.70	Germany; Leonie Beck (17:23.50); Jeannette Spiwoks (17:51.80); Oliver Klemet (16:19.80); Florian Wellbrock (15:53.90)	1:07:29.00

== Diving ==
A FINA team diving exhibition was scheduled for 19 and 20 December and consisted of a mixed gender team event with dives from a 10 metre platform as well as a 3 metre springboard. It was the first FINA-hosted diving mixed team event to be conducted in open water.

Event	Gold		Silver		Bronze	
Mixed 3 m & 10 m team	Brazil; Kawan Figueredo Pereira; Luana Lira; Ingrid Oliveira	416.35	Great Britain; Matthew Dixon; James Heatly; Robyn Birch	385.45	China; Li Zheng; Quan Hongchan; Wang Han; Lian Junjie	384.20

=== Teams ===
Diving began at 10:15 on 19 December with dives one to three on the 19th (day one), dives four to six on the 20th (day two), and the following teams competing.

Rank	Nation	Divers	Day 1 points	Day 2 points	Total points
4	Australia	Cassiel Rousseau; Melissa Wu; Esther Qin	172.50	197.85	370.35
1	Brazil	Kawan Figueredo Pereira; Luana Lira; Ingrid Oliveira	186.75	229.60	416.35
3	China	Li Zheng; Quan Hongchan; Wang Han; Lian Junjie	182.00	202.20	384.20
7	Egypt	Maha Abdelsalam; Mohab Ishak	164.20	166.30	330.50
2	Great Britain	Matthew Dixon; James Heatly; Robyn Birch	173.95	211.50	385.45
6	Italy	Sarah Jodoin Di Maria; Elena Bertocchi; Eduard Cristian Timbretti Gugiu	157.50	175.00	332.50
8	Mexico	Aranza Vázquez; Andrés Villarreal	175.80	147.80	323.60
5	Russia	Maria Polyakova; Ruslan Ternovoi; Evgeny Kuznetsov; Yulia Timoshinina	142.00	206.40	348.40
9	Ukraine	Oleksiy Sereda; Anna Arnautova; Kirill Boliukh; Kseniya Baylo	166.95	155.20	322.15
10	United States	Ginger Huber; Krysta Palmer; Benjamin Bramley	174.75	142.90	317.65

== High diving ==
The 2021 FINA high diving qualifier was held on 19 and 20 December as the final world qualifying event for two events to be held at the 2022 World Aquatics Championships. Women competed in a 20 metre event with prelims on 19 December and finals on 20 December. Men competed in a 27 metre event with prelims on 19 December and finals the following day. Twenty-six high divers, fourteen men and twelve women, had their results from the competition serve as their qualification for the 2022 World Aquatics Championships. In February 2022, FINA removed high diving from the 2022 World Aquatics Championships program, due to a change of location from Fukuoka to Budapest and a lack of infrastructure in the new host location to conduct high diving competition, thus invalidating the qualifications achieved. Four male divers had their results confirm their place as permanent divers in the 2022 Red Bull Cliff Diving World Series, three of whom it was the first time achieving permanent diver status. The highest degree of difficulty dive in history, a 6.2 degree of difficulty, was executed by Aidan Heslop of Great Britain.

Event	Gold		Silver		Bronze	
Women 20 m	Rhiannan Iffland (AUS)	359.60	Molly Carlson (CAN)	323.50	Yana Nestsiarava (BLR)	307.90
Men 27 m	Aidan Heslop (GBR)	436.90	Cătălin Preda (ROU)	433.55	Constantin Popovici (ROU)	432.00

=== Participating countries ===
A total of 50 athletes from 20 countries competed in the high diving events.

- Australia (2)
- Belarus (1)
- Brazil (2)
- Canada (3)
- Colombia (2)
- Czech Republic (1)
- France (2)
- Germany (4)
- Great Britain (3)
- Italy (2)
- Luxembourg (1)
- Mexico (3)
- Netherlands (1)
- Poland (2)
- Romania (2)
- Russia (4)
- Spain (3)
- Switzerland (2)
- Ukraine (4)
- United States (6)
