= Jonathan Schauer =

German diver (born 2005)

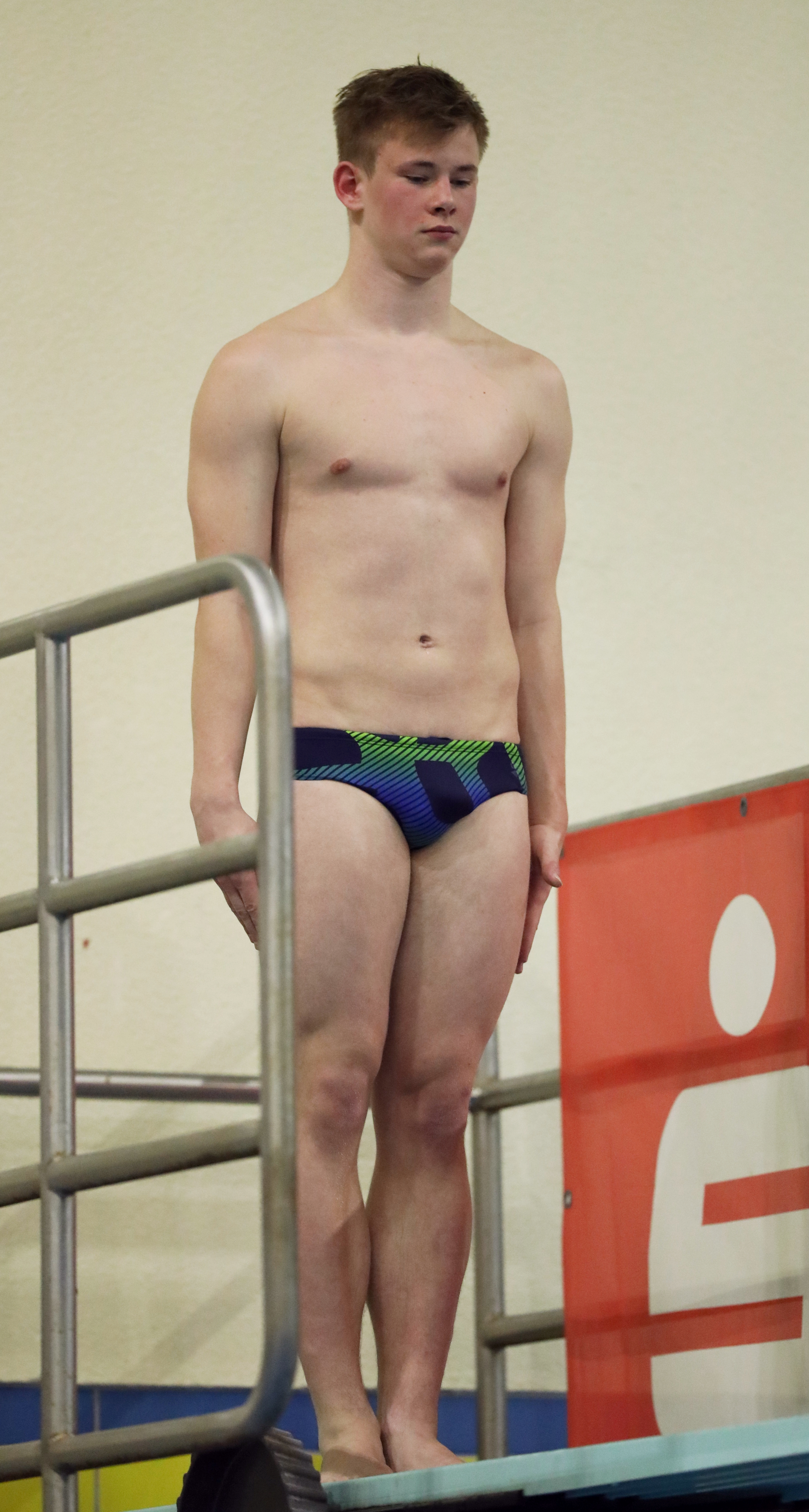
- Schauer in 2023

Personal information
- Full name: Jonathan Gisbert Schauer
- Nationality: German
- Born: 28 May 2005 (age 21)

Sport
- Country: Germany
- Sport: Diving
Medal record
Men's diving
Representing Germany
European Championships
Gold medal – first place	2026 Paris	3 m synchro
European Junior Championships
Silver medal – second place	2022 Otopeni	1 m springboard

Jonathan Gisbert Schauer (born 28 May 2005) is a German diver.

== Career ==
In August 2026, he competed at the 2026 European Aquatics Championships and won a gold medal in the 3 metre synchro event, along with Lou Massenberg, with a score of 423.84.
