= Diving at the 2026 European Aquatics Championships – Men's 3 m synchro springboard =

Men's 3 m synchro springboard at the 2026 European Aquatics Championships
- Venue: Paris Aquatic Centre
- Dates: 3 August
- Competitors: 20 from 10 nations
- Teams: 10
- Winning points: 423.84

Medalists
gold medal	Lou Massenberg; Jonathan Schauer	Germany
silver medal	Evgeny Kuznetsov; Nikita Shleikher	Authorised Neutral Athletes
bronze medal	Stefano Belotti; Matteo Santoro	Italy

The Men's 3 m synchro springboard competition at the 2026 European Aquatics Championships was held on 3 August 2026.

== Results ==
The final was started at 19:00.

Rank	Nation	Points						
Rank	Nation	D1	D2	D3	D4	D5	D6	Total
1st place, gold medalist(s)	Germany; Lou Massenberg; Jonathan Schauer	49.80	47.40	77.52	80.58	81.90	86.64	423.84
2nd place, silver medalist(s)	Neutral Athletes B Evgeny Kuznetsov; Nikita Shleikher	48.00	46.80	73.44	76.50	78.75	85.50	408.99
3rd place, bronze medalist(s)	Italy; Stefano Belotti; Matteo Santoro	49.80	46.80	75.33	67.26	66.30	80.58	386.07
4	Great Britain; Anthony Harding; Jack Laugher	50.40	50.40	58.59	70.38	80.58	75.24	385.59
5	Ukraine; Kirill Boliukh; Stanislav Oliferchyk	48.00	45.00	73.44	70.68	70.68	77.52	385.32
6	France; Jules Bouyer; Alexis Jandard	47.40	47.40	43.86	82.62	77.70	80.94	379.92
7	Spain; Juan Cortés; Max Liñan	47.40	45.00	70.38	66.96	70.68	61.20	361.62
8	Neutral Athletes A Yauheni Kandratovich; Matsvei Lupeka	45.60	42.60	62.10	57.66	58.50	56.70	323.16
9	Sweden; Elias Petersen; Peder Saur Hubred	48.00	43.80	57.60	55.65	44.64	61.20	310.89
10	Croatia; Luka Martinović; Matej Nevešćanin	46.20	0.00	65.70	0.00	63.24	59.40	234.54
