= 2019 European Diving Championships – Team event =

The Team Event of the 2019 European Diving Championships was contested on the first day of the competition, 5 August.

== Results ==
31 athletes from 8 national teams participated at the single-round event.

Rank	Nation	Team	D1	D2	D3	D4	D5	D6	Total
1st place, gold medalist(s)	Germany	Patrick Hausding; Christina Wassen; Tina Punzel; Lou Massenberg	57.00	77.00	65.10	68.80	68.80	68.80	405.50
2nd place, silver medalist(s)	Russia	Ekaterina Beliaeva; Vitalya Koroleva; Viktor Minibaev; Ilia Molchanov	60.00	54.25	66.00	63.00	81.00	76.80	401.05
3rd place, bronze medalist(s)	Great Britain	Eden Cheng; Anthony Harding; Noah Williams; Katherine Torrance	58.50	83.60	52.50	51.20	77.40	68.80	392.00
4	France	Benjamin Auffret; Maïssam Naji; Alexis Jandard; Alaïs Kalonji	54.60	68.40	49.00	52.80	86.70	76.80	388.30
5	Ukraine	Viktoriya Kesar; Oleg Kolodiy; Oleksii Sereda; Sofiya Lyskun	57.00	68.40	55.50	67.20	70.40	59.20	377.70
6	Netherlands	Pascal Faatz; Inge Jansen; Celine van Duijn; Dylan Vork	63.00	40.50	51.00	57.60	54.00	62.40	328.50
7	Italy	Maia Biginelli; Riccardo Giovannini; Andreas Larsen; Sarah Jodoin Di Maria	27.00	62.70	52.50	47.60	49.50	52.80	292.10
8	Sweden	Ellen Ek; Vinko Paradzik; Emma Gullstrand	0.00	73.50	49.50	54.60	61.20	40.50	279.30
