= Anton Knoll =

Austrian diver (born 2004)

Personal information
- Nationality: Austrian
- Born: 21 November 2004 (age 21)

Sport
- Country: Austria
- Sport: Diving
- Events: 10 m, 10 m synchro
Medal record
Men's diving
Representing Austria
European Championships
Gold medal – first place	2024 Belgrade	10 m synchro
European Diving Championships
Bronze medal – third place	2025 Antalya	10 m platform

Anton Knoll (born 21 November 2004) is an Austrian diver. He represented Austria at the 2024 Summer Olympics.

== Career ==
Knoll represented Austria at the 2023 European Games and finished in sixth place in the 10 metre platform with a score of 379.40 points.

In June 2024, Knoll competed at the 2024 European Aquatics Championships and won a gold medal in the 10 metre synchro event, along with Dariush Lotfi, with a score of 367.05 points. This was Austria's first medal in diving at the European Aquatics Championships since 2016, and first gold medal since Kurt Mrkwicka in 1962. In July 2024, he qualified to represent Austria at the 2024 Summer Olympics.

In May 2025, he competed at the 2025 European Diving Championships and won a bronze medal in the 10 metre platform event.
