= 2022 FINA World Junior Diving Championships =

Sports event in Montreal, Canada

- Host city: Montréal, Canada
- Date(s): November 27 – December 4, 2022
- Venue(s): Montreal Olympic Park
- Nations participating: 36
- Athletes participating: 231
- Events: 17
- Website: FINA event page

The 2022 FINA World Junior Diving Championships took place in Montréal, Canada, from 27 November to 4 December 2022.

== Medal summary ==
=== Men's events ===
Event	Gold		Silver		Bronze	
Age Group A
1m springboard A	Matteo Santoro; Italy	469.70	Jake Passmore; Ireland	453.60	Max Fowler; United States	451.15
3m springboard A	Matteo Santoro; Italy	552.40	Jonathan Gisbert Schauer; Germany	531.55	Rafael Max de Almeida; Brazil	511.50
Platform A	Matt Cullen; Canada	542.00	Diogo Silva; Brazil	520.95	Robbie Lee; Great Britain	509.10
Age Group B
1m springboard B	Kyrylo Azarov; Ukraine	431.90	Miguel Tovar; Colombia	424.15	Ivor Brown; United States	402.90
3m springboard B	Kirill Boliukh; Ukraine	439.25	Arnaud Corbeil; Canada	423.50	Valerio Mosca; Italy	414.90
10m platform B	Kirill Boliukh; Ukraine	476.90	Jordan Fisher-Eames; Great Britain	442.90	Joshua Hedberg; United States	438.80

=== Women's events ===
Event	Gold		Silver		Bronze	
Age Group A
1m springboard A	Lotti Hubert; Germany	400.10	Sonya Palkhivala; Canada	392.85	Tilly Brown; Great Britain	388.10
3m springboard A	Sonya Palkhivala; Canada	427.10	Katelyn Fung; Canada	420.35	Lily Witte; United States	414.00
10m platform A	Andrea Spendolini-Sirieix; Great Britain	460.15	Renee Batalla; Canada	427.90	Sofia Knight; Australia	403.75
Age Group B
1m springboard B	Katelyn Fung; Canada	333.20	Molly Gray; United States	323.90	Giorgia De Sanctis; Italy	317.25
3m springboard B	Anna Lemkin; United States	344.75	Lucy Dovison; Australia	334.05	Paige Gillam; Australia	333.80
10m platform B	Charli Petrov; Australia	345.30	Maisie Bond; Great Britain	318.60	Anna Lemkin; United States	305.40

=== Synchronized diving ===
Event	Gold		Silver		Bronze	
Men's events
3m springboard A/B	Italy; Stefano Belotti; Matteo Santoro	299.25	Croatia; Matej Nevešćanin; David Ledinski	296.25	Great Britain; Leon Baker; Hugo Thomas	289.77
10m platform A/B	Germany; Jaden Gregorchuk; Christian Bilke	301.98	Great Britain; Robbie Lee; Euan McCabe	298.74	United States; Tyler Wills; Joshua Hedberg	297.48
Women's events
3m springboard A/B	Canada; Kate Miller; Sonya Palkhivala	272.97	Great Britain; Desharne Bent-Ashmeil; Amy Rollinson	270.30	Australia; Lucy Dovison; Olivia Roche	254.37
10m platform A/B	Australia; Samantha Olivier; Charli Petrov	243.24	Romania; Ioana Cârcu; Nazanin Ellahi	236.46	South Korea; Han Ji-woo; Hyun Ji-won	230.28
Mixed events
Team event	United States; Ellie Joyce; Joshua Hedberg; Ivor Brown; Bayleigh Cranford	381.70	Germany; Lotti Hubert; Espen Prenzyna; Cora Schiebold; Jaden Eikermann Gregorchuk	370.75	Great Britain; Andrea Spendolini-Sirieix; Oscar Kane; Robbie Lee	352.55

=== High diving ===
Event	Gold		Silver		Bronze	
Men's events
15m platform A	Andrea Barnaba; Italy	317.75	Stepan Movchan; Ukraine	281.15	Carter Baker; Canada	274.45
12m platform B	Charles-Antoine Labadie; Canada	288.05	Archie Biggin; Great Britain	279.00	Hugo Rodriguez Gonzales; Spain	261.20
Women's events
15m platform A	Simone Leathead; Canada	265.00	Alejandra Aguilar Tovar; Mexico	228.90	Sydney Kowalski; United States	221.65
12m platform B	Nelli Chukanivska; Ukraine	247.30	Anna Wylie; Canada	245.10	Gabby Mauder; United States	240.30

== Medal table ==
* Host nation (Canada)

Rank	Nation	Gold	Silver	Bronze	Total
1	Canada*	6	5	1	12
2	Italy	4	0	2	6
3	Ukraine	3	1	0	4
4	Germany	2	2	0	4
5	United States	2	1	7	10
6	Australia	2	1	3	6
7	Great Britain	1	4	4	9
8	Brazil	0	1	1	2
9	Colombia	0	1	0	1
9	Croatia	0	1	0	1
9	Ireland	0	1	0	1
9	Mexico	0	1	0	1
9	Romania	0	1	0	1
14	South Korea	0	0	1	1
14	Spain	0	0	1	1
Totals (15 entries)		20	20	20	60

== Participating nations ==
Divers from 36 countries participated at the championships.

- Australia
- Austria
- Brazil
- Canada
- Chinese Taipei
- Colombia
- Croatia
- Cuba
- Czech Republic
- Egypt
- Finland
- France
- Germany
- Great Britain
- Ireland
- Italy
- Japan
- Lithuania
- Malaysia
- Mexico
- New Zealand
- Norway
- Peru
- Philippines
- Poland
- Portugal
- Romania
- Singapore
- South Africa
- South Korea
- Spain
- Sweden
- Switzerland
- Turkey
- Ukraine
- United States
