= Laso Schaller =

Brazilian-Swiss extreme athlete

Laso Schaller (born November 2, 1988, in Teófilo Otoni, Brazil) is a Brazilian-Swiss extreme athlete in high diving. He holds a world record for highest jump from land into water, which was set when he jumped 58.8 metres (193 feet) from a cliff at Cascata del Salto, Switzerland in 2015. .
