= Euan McCabe =

British diver (born 2005)

Personal information
- Nationality: British
- Born: 23 October 2005 (age 20)

Sport
- Sport: Diving

Euan McCabe (born 23 October 2005) is a British athlete who competes in diving.

== Sporting career ==
McCabe made his debut at the 2018 British Diving Championships. He won a bronze medal at the 2024 European Aquatics Championships in the 10 m synchro platform. In 2025, he won the individual platform British title at the Sandwell Aquatics Centre. McCabe competed for Great Britain at the 2025 World Aquatics Championships in Singapore.

== Personal life ==
McCabe is from Plymouth.

== International awards ==
European Championship
Year	Place	Medal	Event
2024	Belgrade (Serbia)	Bronze	10m synchro platform
FINA World Junior Diving Championships
Year	Place	Medal	Event
2022	Montreal (Canada)	Silver	10m platform A/B (with Robbie Lee)
European Junior Swimming Championships
Year	Place	Medal	Event
2022	Otopeni (Romania)	Gold	Synchronised platform (with Robbie Lee)
