= Splash! Vedete la Apă =

Romanian reality television series

- Genre: Reality
- Presented by: Pepe (1–3); Alina Puscas (3); Diana Munteanu (3); Roxana Ionescu (1–2); Bianca Dragusanu (2); Roxana Vancea (1); Răzvan Fodor (4); Anna Lesko (4); Ramona Olaru (4)
- Judges: Ozana Barabancea (2–3); Cătălin Preda(1–3); Cosmin Seleşi (2–3); Anda Adam (1); Daniel Buzdugan (1); Jean de la Craiova (4); Iulia Albu (4); Marin Barbu (4); Bogdan Ioniță (4); Clara Gherase (4)
- Country of origin: Romania
- Original language: Romanian

Production
- Production location: Bacău

Original release
- Network: Antena 1
- Release: 7 July 2013 – 30 August 2024

Splash! Vedete la Apă was a Romanian reality television show that teaches celebrities the art of diving. The first series was premiered on 7 July 2013, and was broadcast by Antena 1. Pepe was hosting the show, with Roxana Ionescu and Roxana Vancea. The judges were Anda Adam, Daniel Buzdugan, and Cătălin Preda. It was hosted by Pepe with Diana Munteanu and Alina Pușcaș. The judges were Ozana Barabancea, Cosmin Seleşi and Cătălin Preda.

== Format ==
The show was broadcast live on Antena 1 on Sunday evenings, and was presented by Pepe with Roxana Ionescu and Roxana Vancea. The celebrities was performing seven weeks in front of a panel of judges and a live audience in an Olympic-size diving pool with the result each week partly determined by public vote.

== Production history ==
The series was first mentioned in May 2013, when it was announced that Antena 1 ordered what was called Celebrity Splash straight to series. Based on the Dutch series of the same name, it has celebrities perform dives from extreme heights and each week the challenges increase in difficulty.

== Judges ==
On 14 June 2013, Daniel Buzdugan, Anda Adam and Cătălin Preda were confirmed as the three judges of the series.

- Cosmin Selesi – courage
- Ozana Barabancea – artistic impression
- Cătălin Preda – technique

== Main series results ==
| Series | Premiere date | Finale date | Number of stars | Number of weeks | Honour places | | | | |
|---|---|---|---|---|---|---|---|---|---|
| Series | Premiere date | Finale date | Number of stars | Number of weeks | Winner | Second place | Third place | Fourth place | Fifth place |
| 1 | 7 July 2013 | 18 August 2013 | 32 | 7 | Piticu` | Marian Drăgulescu | Cornel Păsat | Silvia de la Vegas | CRBL |
| 2 | 11 July 2014 | 5 September 2014 | 32 | 7 | Cosmin Soare | Ionut Pitbull Atodiresei | Vladimir Draghia | Daniela Crudu | Ruby |
| 3 | 23 and 24 July 2015 | 14 September 2015 | 40 | 14 | Alex Velea | Smiley | Ruby | Anda Adam | Delia |

== Season summary ==
=== Season 1 (2013) ===
The debut season started airing on 7 July 2013 on Antena 1. The first season began with thirty-two Romanian celebrities. Vica Blochina withdrew before the series began, and was replaced by Jean de la Craiova. The first season ended on 18 August 2013. Piticu`, a dancer was declared the first winner of the series. The runner-up was gymnast Marian Drăgulescu, followed by stripper Cornel Păsat in third place, singer and violinist Silvia de la Vegas in fourth place and rapper CRBL was in the last place.

=== Season 2 (2014) ===
On 17 August 2013 was announced the second season of series. In this season in the judges Daniel Buzdugan and Anda Adam are replaced by Cosmin Selesi and Ozana Barabancea with Cătălin Preda. In this season Roxana Vancea, co host of the first season was replaced by the new host, Bianca Draguseanu. The season started on 11 July 2014 and ended on 5 September 2014. Cosmin Soare, a dancer was declared the second winner of the series. The runner-up was boxer Ionut Atodireserei, followed by actor Vladimir Draghia in third place, model Daniela Crudu in fourth place and singer Ruby was in the last place. This season involved Maria Casian, a 9-year-old girl who is ill but plays this sport.

=== Season 3 (2015) ===
On 1 June 2015 was announced the third season of series without a promo. The judges are the same of the past season, the Co host Roxana Ionescu and Bianca Draguseanu are replaced by Diana Munteanu and Alina Pușcaș with Pepe for this season. In this season, there are 40 Romanian Celebrities, they pass 3 on semifinal not 4 on the past 2 seasons. There are a new case, Marina and Andreea Sandu two children without 9 and 12 years, who are small champions of Romania. The season started airing on 23 and 24 July 2015 in two evening. In this season there disqualified 2 celebrities, first time in the history of series.

== Overall ratings summary ==
| Season | Timeslot (EDT) | Season premiere | Premiere viewers (in millions) | Season finale | Finale viewers (in millions) | TV season | Rank |
|---|---|---|---|---|---|---|---|
| 1 | Sunday 8:30 pm | 7 July 2013 | 1 566 | 18 August 2013 | 1 086 | 2013 | 1 |
| 2 | Friday 8:30 pm | 11 July 2014 | 1 112 | 5 September 2014 | 1 086 | 2014 | 1 |
| 3 | Thursday and Friday 8:30 pm | 23 and 24 July 2015 | TBA | TBA 2015 | TBA | 2015 | TBA |
