= Aidan Heslop =

British diver

Personal information
- Nationality: British; English
- Born: 18 April 2002 (age 24) Chelmsford, England
- Height: 1.77 m (5 ft 10 in)

Sport
- Country: Great Britain, Wales
- Sport: High diving, diving
- Events: 27 m, 10 m platform, mixed 10 m synchro, 3 m springboard
- Club: Plymouth Diving Club
- Partner: Molly Carlson
Medal record
Men's high diving
Representing Great Britain
World Championships
Gold medal – first place	2024 Doha	Men
FINA Aquatics Festival
Gold medal – first place	2021 Abu Dhabi	27 m high dive
Men's diving
FINA Diving Grand Prix
Bronze medal – third place	2017 Madrid	10 m platform
Bronze medal – third place	2018 Madrid	10 m platform

Aidan Heslop (born 18 April, 2002) is a British diver and high diver who competes internationally, representing Wales and Great Britain. In 2024, he won gold in the men's high dive at the 2024 World Aquatics Championships.

At the 2018 Commonwealth Games, he competed representing Wales, finishing 6th in the 10 metre platform and 12th in the 3 metre springboard. In 2021, he won the gold medal in the 27 metre high dive at the Abu Dhabi Aquatics Festival, representing Great Britain and performing the highest difficulty dive, a 6.2 degree of difficulty, in history. He placed sixth in the inaugural men's high dive at the 2022 European Aquatics Championships.

== Background ==
Heslop was born 18 April, 2002 in Chelmsford, England. He started competitive cliff diving when he was 12 years old. He is eligible to compete representing Wales as his mother is Welsh born. For his pool training, Heslop trains in Plymouth. Heslop has listed skateboarding and BMX racing as two alternative sports had he not chosen to pursue high diving. He and his diving partner, Ruby Thorne, made their debut as partners at the international championships competition at the 2022 Commonwealth Games, with both representing Team Wales, after competing together at the British National Diving Cup on 11 February, 2022.

== Career ==
=== 2017 ===
At the 2017 FINA Diving Grand Prix stop in Madrid, Spain, Heslop won the bronze medal in the 10 metre platform with a score of 391.15 points.

=== 2018 Commonwealth Games ===
When he was 15 years old, Heslop became the first diver to represent Wales at a Commonwealth Games in 20 years at the 2018 Commonwealth Games in Gold Coast, Australia in April, with the previous diver being Robert Morgan at the 1998 Commonwealth Games. In the preliminary round of the 3 metre springboard on 12 April, Heslop qualified for the final ranking 11th with a score of 352.80. For the final later in the day, he scored a 285.15 and placed 12th overall. On 14 April, Heslop scored 385.10 points in the preliminary round of the 10 metre platform and advanced to the final ranked fifth. In the final later the same day, Heslop placed sixth with a score of 395.95 points.

=== 2018 Grand Prix and World Series ===
Heslop won the bronze medal in the 10 metre platform event behind Xiaohu Tai and Bowen Huang, both of China at the 2018 FINA Diving Grand Prix stop in Madrid, Spain in July with a score of 390.60 points. In September 2018, Heslop became the youngest diver to compete in a Red Bull Cliff Diving World Series when he was 16 years old and competed at the World Series stop in Polignano a Mare, Italy.

=== 2019 Cliff Diving World Series ===
At the 2019 Red Bull Cliff Diving World Series stop in Bilbao, Spain in September, Heslop became the youngest diver to win a medal of any kind at a Red Bull Cliff Diving World Series, winning the bronze medal with a score of 384.60 points.

=== 2020–2021 ===
During the COVID-19 pandemic, and before returning to competitions, Heslop's training pool was closed for a few months due to the pandemic, and for repairs, and he underwent wrist surgery. As part of the 2021 Red Bull Cliff Diving World Series stop in County Mayo, Ireland, Heslop earned two 10 scores from judges for his final round dive.

==== Abu Dhabi Aquatics Festival ====
Heslop won the gold medal in the 27 metre high dive event with a score of 436.90 points at the FINA High Diving Qualifier held as part of the Abu Dhabi Aquatics Festival in Abu Dhabi, United Arab Emirates in December, earning first-place less than five points ahead of silver medalist Cătălin Preda and bronze medalist Constantin Popovici, both of Romania. His final dive was a 6.2 degree of difficulty, which was the highest difficulty dive executed in history and earned him a qualification for the 2022 World Aquatics Championships. The gold medal was the first of his high diving career and confirmed Heslop as a permanent diver for the 2022 Red Bull Cliff Diving World Series, which was his first time receiving permanent diver status for a World Series. His execution of the 6.2 difficulty dive earned him the number four top moment from the 2021 World Short Course Swimming Championships and the Abu Dhabi Aquatics Festival by FINA.

=== 2022 ===
Training in early 2022, Heslop focused his efforts on the 2022 Red Bull Cliff Diving World Series, 2022 World Aquatics Championships, and representing Wales at the 2022 Commonwealth Games. In January, FINA announced the World Aquatics Championships were delayed until 2023. The next month, February, FINA announced a new 2022 World Aquatics Championships that would not include high diving. The following week, on the first day of the 2022 British National Diving Cup, he placed third with diving partner Ruby Thorne in the 10 metre synchronized platform event with a score of 244.83 points. In April, Heslop was officially announced as one of 16 permanent divers for the 2022 Red Bull Cliff Diving World Series. Later in the same month, he topped platform scoring over the first two days of the British Elite Junior Diving Championships. At the first stop of the 2022 Red Bull Cliff Diving World Series, held on 4 June in Boston, United States, Heslop won the title across all rounds of competition with a score of 462.50 points, which was over 30 points ahead of the next-highest scoring competitor, and marked his first time winning a gold medal at a Red Bull Cliff Diving World Series event.

==== 2022 Commonwealth Games ====
Heslop was named to the Wales roster for the 2022 Commonwealth Games alongside his partner, Ruby Thorne, in the mixed 10 metre synchronized event as well as individually in the 10 metre platform event. Day four of diving competition, he ranked ninth in the preliminaries of the 10 metre platform, qualifying for the final with a score of 341.55 points. In the final, he improved his score to 408.00 points and placed eighth. In the final of the mixed 10 metre synchronized platform the following day, he and his partner Ruby Thorne made their debut at an international championships, placing eighth with a score of 284.28 points.

==== 2022 European Aquatics Championships ====
For the 2022 European Aquatics Championships, held in August in Rome, Italy, Heslop entered to compete in the 27 metre high diving event. For the first dive of the competition, he tied Oleksiy Pryhorov of Ukraine for sixth-rank with a score of 72.80 points for a 2.8 degree of difficulty dive. The following day, after the second of four total dives, he ranked second with a score of 213.20 points. He culminated with a score of 392.90 points for the four dives, finishing 62.80 points behind gold medalist Constantin Popovici of Romania to place sixth.

At the 2022 Red Bull Cliff Diving World Series stop held the following month in Sisikon, Switzerland, Heslop won the gold medal and moved up in the overall 2022 World Series rankings to second. At the next stop, in Polignano a Mare, Italy, on 18 September, he retained his overall second rank and won the silver medal for the stop with a score of 435.80 points. He won the silver medal again approximately one month later at the stop held in Sydney, Australia.

2023 Red Bull Cliff Diving World Series

At during the 2023 Red Bull Cliff Diving World Series located in Polignano a Mare, Italy, Heslop won 2nd place over all.

== International championships ==
Meet	3 metre springboard	10 metre platform	mixed 10 metre synchro	27 metre high dive
CG 2018	12th (285.15)	6th (395.95)	—N/a	—N/a
ADAF 2021	—N/a	—N/a	—N/a	(gold) (436.90)
CG 2022		8th (408.00)	8th (284.28)	—N/a
EC 2022				6th (392.90)

== Adventures ==
In December 2021, Heslop went skydiving over Jumeirah Beach in Dubai, United Arab Emirates.

== See also ==
- Wales at the 2018 Commonwealth Games
- Abu Dhabi Aquatics Festival
