= Rick Charls =

American high diver

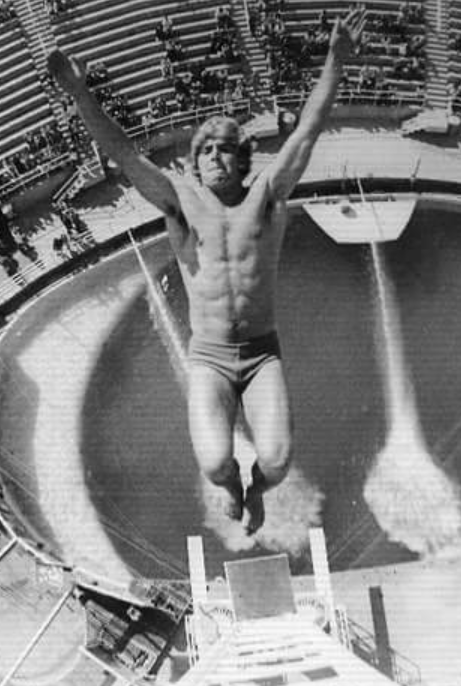
- Charls in 1983
- Born: Cincinnati, Ohio, United States
- Education: Oak Hills High School, Ohio University
- Occupation: Diver
- Known for: High Diving

Rick Charls is a former American high diver who currently holds the World Record for the Highest Dive from 172 ft / 52 meters.

== Background ==
Charls, a native of Cincinnati, Ohio, was a high school and collegiate All-American and a two-time Mid-American Conference diving champion at Ohio University.

== Career ==
Charls made his record-breaking dive at SeaWorld San Diego, which was viewed by millions of people on ABC's Wide World of Sports. The dive was performed in conjunction with the Guinness World Records and the International Swimming Hall of Fame. Since 1983, many divers have tried to break this record, but sustained injuries upon impact with the water and had to be rescued.

Charls, Rick Winters, Bruce Bocchia, Mike Foley and Dana Kunze were the only divers to receive credit for the 172 feet (52 m) dive. Charls also earned honors as the 1980 world tandem high diving champion, along with third-place finishes and bronze medals at the 1982 World Target High Diving Championships in Hawaii and the World Acrobatic High Diving Championships at SeaWorld in Florida.
