= Diving at the 2022 European Aquatics Championships – Mixed 3 m springboard synchro =

Mixed 3 m springboard synchro at the 2022 European Aquatics Championships
- Venue: Foro Italico
- Dates: 17 August
- Competitors: 16 from 8 nations
- Winning points: 294.69

Medalists
gold medal	Lou Massenberg; Tina Punzel	Germany
silver medal	James Heatly; Grace Reid	Great Britain
bronze medal	Chiara Pellacani; Matteo Santoro	Italy

The Mixed 10 m platform synchro competition of the 2022 European Aquatics Championships was held on 17 August 2022.

== Results ==
The final started at 13:50.

Rank	Nation	Divers	Points					
Rank	Nation	Divers	T1	T2	T3	T4	T5	Total
1st place, gold medalist(s)	Germany	Lou Massenberg; Tina Punzel	47.40	46.20	66.60	67.89	66.60	294.69
2nd place, silver medalist(s)	Great Britain	James Heatly; Grace Reid	45.00	45.60	65.70	67.50	66.96	290.76
3rd place, bronze medalist(s)	Italy	Chiara Pellacani; Matteo Santoro	48.60	45.60	61.20	66.96	61.20	283.56
4	Sweden	Emilia Nilsson; Elias Petersen	44.40	45.60	63.00	63.90	66.60	283.50
5	Switzerland	Madeline Coquoz; Guillaume Dutoit	45.00	39.00	62.10	60.30	66.96	273.36
6	Ukraine	Viktoriya Kesar; Stanislav Oliferchyk	45.00	42.00	57.60	60.30	64.17	269.07
7	Spain	Max Linan; Rocío Velázquez	40.80	40.80	60.30	59.52	58.50	259.92
8	France	Jules Bouyer; Naïs Gillet	42.60	39.60	55.44	50.40	51.84	239.88
