= Diving at the 2024 European Aquatics Championships – Mixed 3 m springboard synchro =

Mixed 3 m springboard synchro at the 2024 European Aquatics Championships
- Venue: Serbian Institute for Sports and Sports Medicine
- Dates: 19 June
- Competitors: 14 from 7 nations
- Winning points: 268.50

Medalists
gold medal	Ben Cutmore; Desharne Bent-Ashmeil	Great Britain
silver medal	Elias Petersen; Emilia Nilsson Garip	Sweden
bronze medal	Lou Massenberg; Jana Lisa Rother	Germany

The Mixed 3 m springboard synchro competition of the 2024 European Aquatics Championships was held on 19 June 2024.

== Results ==
The final started at 15:30.

Rank	Nation	Divers	Points					
Rank	Nation	Divers	T1	T2	T3	T4	T5	Total
1st place, gold medalist(s)	Great Britain	Ben Cutmore; Desharne Bent-Ashmeil	46.80	42.60	52.20	63.90	63.00	268.50
2nd place, silver medalist(s)	Sweden	Elias Petersen; Emilia Nilsson Garip	46.80	43.80	61.20	50.22	59.40	261.42
3rd place, bronze medalist(s)	Germany	Lou Massenberg; Jana Lisa Rother	45.00	42.00	54.00	59.40	60.45	260.85
4	Ukraine	Bohdan Chyzhovskyi; Viktoriya Kesar	46.20	45.00	52.20	56.70	58.59	258.69
5	Norway	Isak Børslien; Caroline Kupka	46.20	42.60	56.28	57.96	47.79	247.23
6	Poland	Kacper Lesiak; Aleksandra Błażowska	42.60	42.00	55.80	48.60	53.76	242.76
7	Georgia	Giorgi Tsulukidze; Tekle Sharia	38.40	35.40	49.41	42.48	45.36	211.05
