= Domenico Rinaldi =

Italian diver (born 1959)

Personal information
- Nationality: Italian
- Born: 24 April 1959 (age 67) Pontevico, Italy

Sport
- Sport: Diving
Medal record
Men's diving
Representing Italy
European Championships
Bronze medal – third place	1985 Sofia	10 m platform

Domenico Rinaldi (born 24 April 1959) is an Italian diver. He competed at the 1984 Summer Olympics and the 1988 Summer Olympics.
