= Ben Cutmore =

English diver (born 2003)

Personal information
- Full name: Benjamin Paul Cutmore
- Born: 10 March 2003 (age 23) Cambridge, England

Sport
- Country: United Kingdom
- Sport: Diving
Medal record
Men's diving
Representing Great Britain
European Games
Bronze medal – third place	2023 Kraków-Małopolska	10 m synchro
European Championships
Gold medal – first place	2022 Rome	10 m synchro
Gold medal – first place	2024 Belgrade	3 m mixed synchro
Bronze medal – third place	2022 Rome	10 m platform
Bronze medal – third place	2024 Belgrade	10 m platform
Bronze medal – third place	2024 Belgrade	10 m synchro
European Diving Championships
Bronze medal – third place	2023 Rzeszów	10 m synchro
Bronze medal – third place	2025 Antalya	3 m mixed synchro
FINA Diving Grand Prix
Silver medal – second place	2022 Calgary	10 m synchro

Benjamin Paul Cutmore (born 10 March 2003) is an English diver who represents Great Britain.

== Career ==
Cutmore was born in Cambridge, but moved to London to train at the London Aquatics Centre.

=== 2022 ===
At the 2022 FINA Diving Grand Prix in Calgary, Cutmore won the silver medal in the 10 metre synchronised platform with partner Kyle Kothari. At the 2022 Commonwealth Games held in Birmingham, Cutmore placed fourth in the 10 metre synchronised platform. At the 2022 European Aquatics Championships in Rome, he won gold in the 10 metre synchronised platform.
