= Constantin Popovici =

Romanian diver (born 1988)

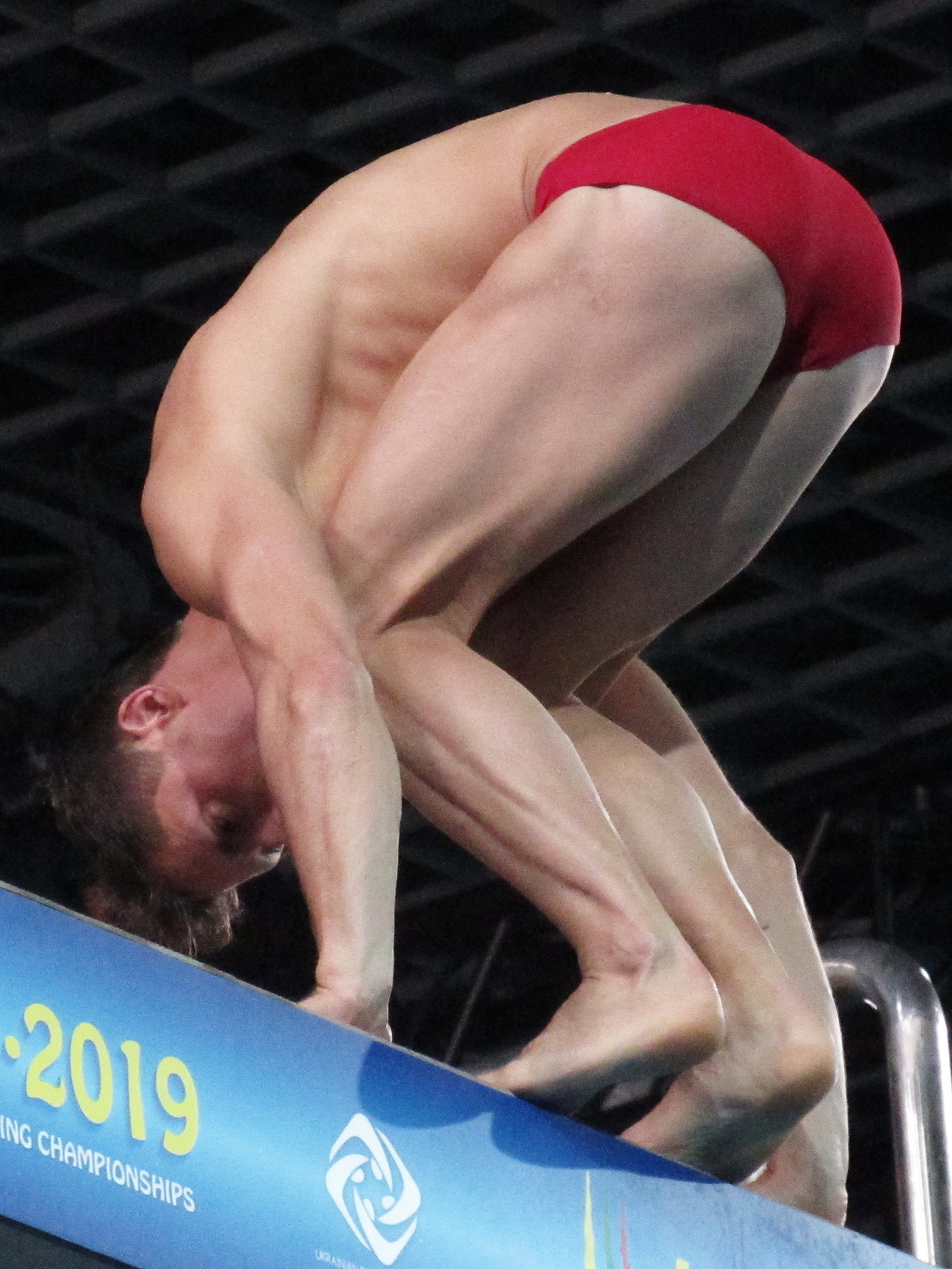

Personal information
- Nationality: Romanian
- Born: 2 October 1988 (age 37) Bucharest, Romania
- Height: 1.70 m (5 ft 7 in)
- Weight: 63 kg (139 lb)

Sport
- Country: Romania
- Sport: Diving, high diving
- Event: Platform
- Club: CSA Steaua București
- Coached by: Florin Avasiloaie
Medal record
Men's high diving
Representing Romania
World Championships
Gold medal – first place	2023 Fukuoka	Men
Bronze medal – third place	2025 Singapore	Men
European Championships
Gold medal – first place	2022 Rome	27 m high dive
FINA Aquatics Festival
Bronze medal – third place	2021 Abu Dhabi	27 m high dive
Men's diving
FINA Diving Grand Prix
Bronze medal – third place	2008 Rome	10 m platform
Bronze medal – third place	2019 Rostock	10 m synchro

Constantin Popovici (born 2 October 1988) is a Romanian platform diver. In 2019, he became the first Romanian to achieve a first-place finish at a stop of the Red Bull Cliff Diving World Series. He is the 2022 European champion in the 27 metre high dive. He has won multiple medals as part of the Red Bull Cliff Diving World Series and he won the bronze medal in the 27 metre high dive event at the Abu Dhabi Aquatics Festival in 2021. For the 10 metre platform event at the 2008 Summer Olympics, he placed twenty-third overall.

== Background ==
Popovici is a member of CSA Steaua Bucuresti Diving Club and is coached and trained by Avasiloaie Florin.

== Career ==
=== 2008: Olympic debut ===
Popovici represented Romania at the 2008 Summer Olympics in Beijing, where he competed for the 10 metre platform event. He placed twenty-third out of thirty divers in the preliminary round, with a total score of 392.30, after six successive attempts.

=== 2019 ===
As part of the 2019 Red Bull Cliff Diving World Series, Popovici won the gold medal at the stop held in Dublin, Ireland in May, marking the first time in the history of the Red Bull Cliff Diving World Series that a Romanian achieved a first-place finish.

=== 2021–2022 ===
In the third round of competition of the 2021 Red Bull Cliff Diving World Series stop held in County Mayo, Ireland in September, Popovici earned four tens and won the silver medal, finishing ahead of bronze medalist Alessandro De Rose of Italy and behind Gary Hunt of France. On the first day of high diving competition at the Abu Dhabi Aquatics Festival, held in December 2021 in Abu Dhabi, United Arab Emirates, he was leading in the 27 metre event with a score of 210.60 points. The second and final day, he won the bronze medal in the event, achieving a mark of 432.00 points and scoring just 4.90 points behind gold medalist in the event Aidan Heslop of Great Britain.

At the stop of the 2022 Red Bull Cliff Diving World Series held in Paris, France in June, Popovici won the bronze medal with a score of 432.90 points, rounding out the podium with gold medalist Cătălin Preda, also of Romania, and Gary Hunt of France. The following month, he placed 21st in the 10 metre platform event at the 2022 World Aquatics Championships, held at Danube Arena in Budapest, Hungary, with a score of 345.10 points. Later in the month, at the stop of the Red Bull Cliff Diving World Series held in Copenhagen, Denmark, he won his first gold medal of the 2022 World Series, scoring 426.10 points to finish over 25 points ahead of silver medalist Cătălin Preda and over 30 points ahead of bronze medalist Nikita Fedotov.

==== 2022 European Aquatics Championships ====
Popovici entered to compete in the 27 metre high dive at the 2022 European Aquatics Championships, held in August in Rome, Italy, with the second dive in his dive order ranking as the highest degree of difficulty dive of all entrants at a 5.8 degree of difficulty. His first dive, on 18 August with a 2.8 degree of difficulty, scored 75.60 points, which tied him in rank for third with the Italians Andrea Barnaba and Alessandro De Rose. For his second of the three dives on the dive order, and leading up to one optional dive not on the dive order, he brought his total score across the first two dives up to 206.10 points and ranked fourth. By the end of competition, he had amassed 455.70 points across all four dives, winning the gold medal 19.50 points ahead of fellow Romanian Cătălin Preda.

One week later, Popovici won the stop of the 2022 Cliff Diving World Series held in Mostar, Bosnia and Herzegovina, with a score of 481.50 points, which set a new record for the highest score ever achieve at a single Red Bull Cliff Diving World Series stop.

== International championships ==
Meet	10 metre platform	mixed 10 metre synchro	27 metre high dive
OG 2008	23rd (392.30)	—N/a	—N/a
WC 2009	8th (476.20)	—N/a	—N/a
WC 2019	41st (292.70)		
EC 2019	11th (359.60)	5th (269.34)	—N/a
EC 2020	8th (426.30)		—N/a
ADAF 2021	—N/a	—N/a	(bronze) (432.00)
WC 2022	21st (345.10)		—N/a
EC 2022			(gold) (455.70)
