= Stefano Belotti =

Italian youth world champion diver (born 2004)

Personal information
- Born: 23 July 2004 (age 22) Alzano Lombardo, Italy
- Occupation: Diver

Sport
- Country: Italy
- Sport: Diving
- Events: European Junior Championships (3m Synchronized, 3m springboard, 1m springboard), World Junior Championships (Team Event)
- Club: Bergamo Tuffi
Medal record
Men's diving
Representing Italy
European Championships
Bronze medal – third place	2024 Belgrade	1 m springboard
Bronze medal – third place	2026 Paris	3 m synchro

Stefano Belotti (born 23 July 2004) is a diver who competes internationally for Italy. His last result is the first place for the men's 3m springboard synchronized during the world Junior Championships 2022 . He competes in 10m platform, 1m springboard, 3m springboard, jump event, synchronized diving 3m and team event. He won the gold medal with Matteo Santoro in synchronized diving 3m and the silver in 1m springboard during the European Junior (Bucharest) and junior world Championships ( Montreal) 2022. Stefano Belotti is currently an athlete of the Fiamme Gialle.
