= Dariush Lotfi =

Austrian diver (born 2001)

Personal information
- Nationality: Austrian
- Born: 5 January 2001 (age 25)

Sport
- Country: Austria
- Sport: Diving
- Events: 10 m, 10 m synchro
Medal record
Men's diving
Representing Austria
European Championships
Gold medal – first place	2024 Belgrade	10 m synchro

Dariush Lotfi (born 5 January 2001) is an Austrian diver.

== Career ==
In June 2024, Lotfi competed at the 2024 European Aquatics Championships and won a gold medal in the 10 metre synchro event, along with Anton Knoll, with a score of 367.05 points. This was Austria's first medal in diving at the European Aquatics Championships since 2016, and first gold medal since Kurt Mrkwicka in 1962.
