= Lou Massenberg =

German diver (born 2000)

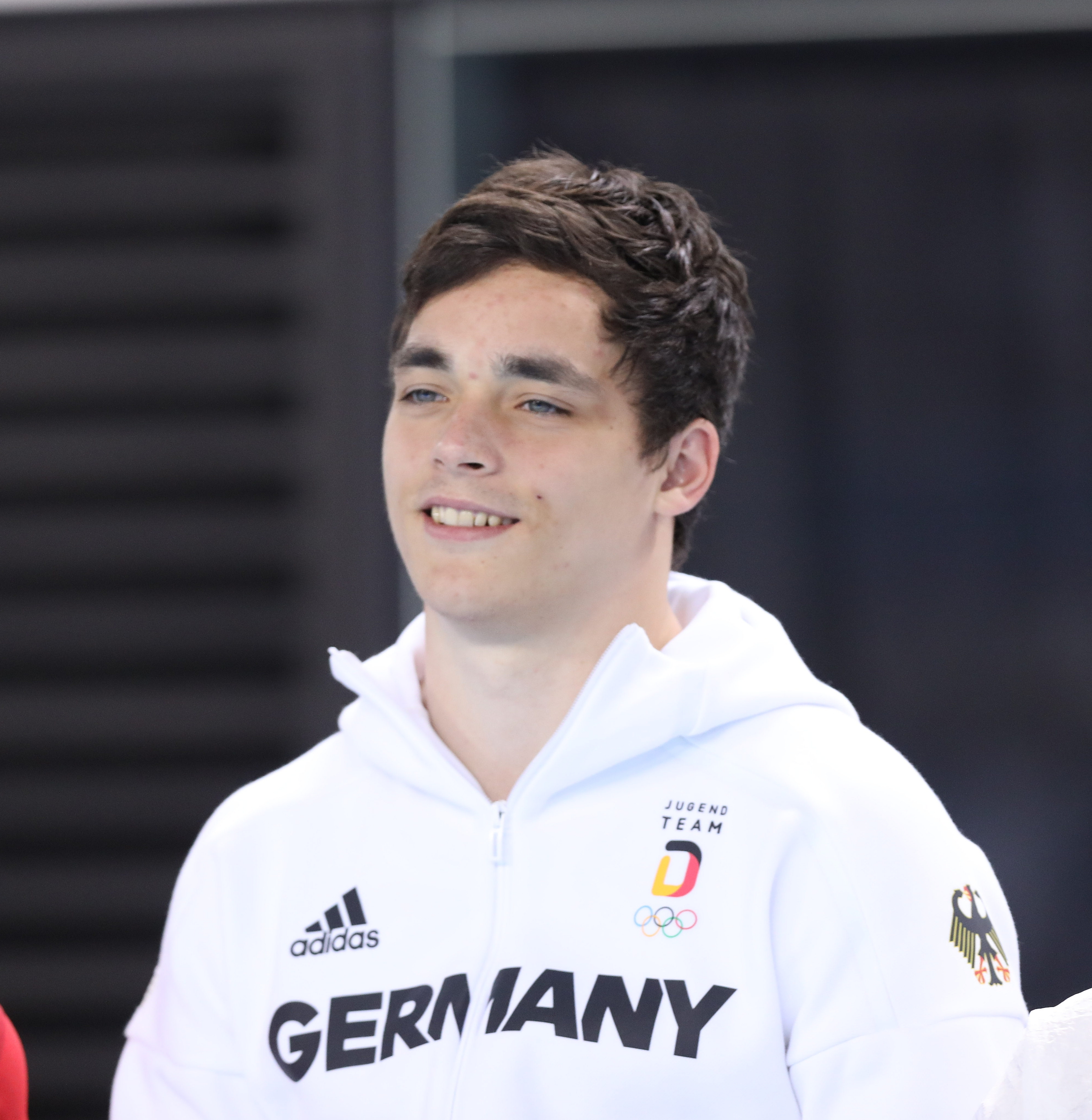

Personal information
- Nationality: German
- Born: 13 November 2000 (age 25)
- Height: 1.73 m (5 ft 8 in)
- Weight: 72 kg (159 lb)

Sport
- Country: Germany
- Sport: Diving
- Event: 3 m synchro
- Club: Berliner TSC
Medal record
World Championships
Bronze medal – third place	2019 Gwangju	3 m mixed synchro
European Aquatics Championships
Gold medal – first place	2018 Glasgow	3 m mixed synchro
Gold medal – first place	2022 Rome	3 m mixed synchro
Gold medal – first place	2026 Paris	3 m synchro
Silver medal – second place	2018 Glasgow	Team event
Silver medal – second place	2020 Budapest	3 m mixed synchro
Bronze medal – third place	2020 Budapest	Team event
Bronze medal – third place	2024 Belgrade	3 m mixed synchro
Bronze medal – third place	2024 Belgrade	Team event
European Diving Championships
Gold medal – first place	2019 Kyiv	Team Event
Bronze medal – third place	2017 Kyiv	3 m mixed synchro
Bronze medal – third place	2019 Kyiv	3 m mixed synchro
World University Games
Silver medal – second place	2021 Chengdu	3 m synchro
Silver medal – second place	2021 Chengdu	10 m synchro

Lou Massenberg (born 13 November 2000) is a German diver.

He is a three-time European champion, having won a gold medal in the 3 m mixed synchro springboard competition at the 2018 European Aquatics Championships and 2022 European Aquatics Championships as well as gold in the team event at the 2019 European Diving Championships. Additionally, he was a medalist at the 2019 World Aquatics Championships.
