= Dana Kunze =

American champion high-diver (born 1961)

Personal information
- Born: January 27, 1961 (age 65) Minneapolis, United States

Sport
- Sport: Diving

Dana Kunze (born January 27, 1961) is an American champion high-diver. He has held the world records for the highest dives. Kunze began his professional high diving career in 1974 at the age of 13. He won his first world championship in 1977 and maintained a winning streak for seven years.

Since 1985, Kunze has operated a company, Water Show Productions, that specializes in high dive-themed aquatic shows.
