= Kurt Mrkwicka =

Austrian diver and film producer

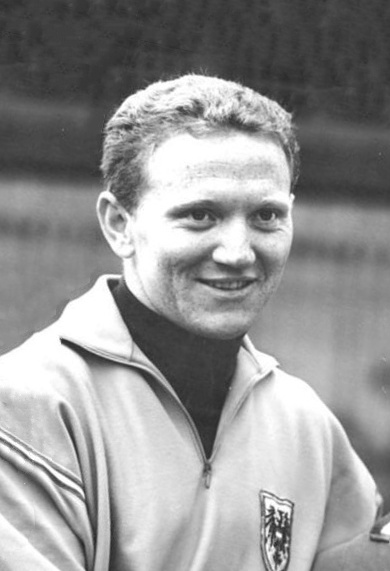
- Kurt Mrkwicka in 1962

Personal information
- Born: 16 July 1937 (age 88) Vienna, Austria
- Height: 1.79 m (5 ft 10 in)
- Weight: 74 kg (163 lb)

Sport
- Sport: Diving
- Club: Schwimm-Union Wien
Medal record
Representing Austria
European Championships
Gold medal – first place	1962 Leipzig	Springboard

Kurt Mrkwicka (born 16 July 1937) is a retired Austrian diver. Mrkwicka competed in the 10 m platform and 3 m springboard events at the 1960 and 1964 Summer Olympics with the best achievement of ninth place on the platform in 1960. He won the springboard competition at the 1962 European Aquatics Championships.

After retiring from diving, in 1967 he established MR Film, a Vienna-based company that by 2013 had produced over 500 films. He is also a member of the supervisory panel of the therapeutic horse riding center Xenophon.

In 1983 and 1984 Kurt Mrkwicka produced the television series Waldheimat based on Peter Rossegger's famous autobiographical book from 1877.
