= World Aquatics Junior Diving Championships =

International sporting event

The World Aquatics Junior Diving Championships is a diving championship event organized by FINA for boys and girls.

== History ==
First held in 1977. Results:

Age groups (A and B):

1. Group A for divers from 16 to 18 years old.
2. Group B for divers from 14 to 16 years old.

== Editions ==
Number	Year	Host city	Host country	Dates	Divers	Countries	Events	Top nation
1	1977							
2	1979							
3	1981							
4	1983							
5	1985	Woodlands	United States	21–24 August				
6	1987	Hamar	Norway	6–9 August				
7	1989	Madrid	Spain	24–27 August				
8	1991	Örebro	Sweden	8–11 August				Germany
9	1993	London	Great Britain	18–22 August				Russia
10	1995	Guangzhou	China	8–13 August				United States
11	1997	Penang	Malaysia	13–17 November				China
12	1999	Pardubice	Czech Republic	18–22 August				Canada
13	2000	Calgary	Canada	16–21 August				China
14	2002	Aachen	Germany	14–18 August				China
15	2004	Belém	Brazil	27–31 October				Mexico
16	2006	Kuala Lumpur	Malaysia	23–27 August			14	China
17	2008	Aachen	Germany	16–21 September			14	China
18	2010	Tucson	United States	1–6 September			14	China
19	2012	Adelaide	Australia	8–13 October			14	China
20	2014	Penza	Russia	9–14 September			14	China
21	2016	Kazan	Russia	29 November – 4 December			14	China
22	2018	Kyiv	Ukraine	23–29 July	200	30	17	China
23	2021	Kyiv	Ukraine	2–9 December		23	17	Germany and Ukraine
24	2022	Montreal	Canada	25 November – 4 December	231	36	17	Canada
25	2024	Rio de Janeiro	Brazil	24 November – 1 December	250+	40	17	Mexico
25	2026	Rijeka	Croatia	21 August – 28 August	250+	40	17	Russia

== Medals ==
=== 2006 ===
16th Fina World Junior Diving Championships

23.08.2006-27.08.2006

ÜBERSICHT HOME

Platz Land Gold Silber Bronze 4. Platz 5. Platz 6. Platz

1. CHN 9 8 3 1 1

2. UKR 1 3 2 2 3 2

3. USA 1 1 1 2 1

4. MAS 1 1 2

5. JPN 1 1

6. AUS 1 1

7. CAN 1 2 5 1

8. RUS 1 5 2 3

9. GER 2 1 2

10. MEX 2 1 1

11. GBR 1 1 1

12. ITA 1

13. KOR 1

14. VEN 2

=== 2008 ===
17th FINA Junior Diving World Championships

16.09.2008-21.09.2008

ÜBERSICHT HOME

Platz Land Gold Silber Bronze 4. Platz 5. Platz 6. Platz

1. CHN 13 6 4 2

2. RUS 1 2 4 2 1 1

3. GBR 2 3

4. USA 2 1 3 2

5. CAN 1 1 3 1 1

6. UKR 1 1 2 3

7. AUS 3 2

8. JPN 1 1 1

9. GER 1 2

10. MEX 1 3 2

11. CUB 1 1

12. MAS 1 1

13. BLR 1

=== 2010 ===
18th FINA Junior Diving World Championships

01.09.2010-06.09.2010

ÜBERSICHT HOME

Platz Land Gold Silber Bronze 4. Platz 5. Platz 6. Platz

1. CHN 6 6 6 1 2 1

2. USA 3 4 2 2 4 1

3. GBR 2 1 2

4. MEX 1 2 1 2

5. JPN 1 1 1 1

6. RUS 1 2 3

7. AUS 2 2 1 2

8. UKR 3 1 1 1

9. CAN 1 1 1 1

10. ITA 2 1

11. MAS 1

12. GER 1 1

13. COL 1

13. NZL 1

=== 2012 ===
19th FINA Junior Diving World Championships

08.10.2012-13.10.2012

ÜBERSICHT HOME

Platz Land Gold Silber Bronze 4. Platz 5. Platz 6. Platz

1. CHN 10 10 2 2 2

2. GBR 3 2 1 1

3. USA 1 2 1 4

4. RUS 2 2 6 1

5. AUS 5 4 2 3

6. MEX 1 3 1

7. COL 1 1 3

8. UKR 1 1 2

9. ITA 1

9. CAN 1

11. JPN 1

11. MAS 1

=== 2014 ===
Rank	Nation	Gold	Silver	Bronze	Total
1	China (CHN)	7	2	5	14
2	Australia (AUS)	2	1	3	6
3	Mexico (MEX)	1	2	2	5
4	Denmark (DEN)	1	1	0	2
5	Colombia (COL)	1	0	0	1
5	Japan (JPN)	1	0	0	1
5	United States (USA)	1	0	0	1
8	Russia (RUS)	0	7	1	8
9	Great Britain (GBR)	0	1	2	3
10	Germany (GER)	0	0	1	1
Totals (10 entries)		14	14	14	42

=== 2016 ===
Rank	Nation	Gold	Silver	Bronze	Total
1	China (CHN)	7	4	2	13
2	Russia (RUS)	3	3	4	10
3	Germany (GER)	2	0	0	2
4	Great Britain (GBR)	1	1	2	4
5	United States (USA)	1	1	0	2
6	Mexico (MEX)	0	2	0	2
7	Australia (AUS)	0	1	2	3
8	Ukraine (UKR)	0	1	1	2
9	Colombia (COL)	0	1	0	1
10	Canada (CAN)	0	0	2	2
11	Japan (JPN)	0	0	1	1
Totals (11 entries)		14	14	14	42

=== 2018 ===
Rank	Nation	Gold	Silver	Bronze	Total
1	China (CHN)	14	8	2	24
2	Great Britain (GBR)	1	2	0	3
3	Canada (CAN)	1	0	1	2
3	Colombia (COL)	1	0	1	2
5	Russia (RUS)	0	3	3	6
6	United States (USA)	0	3	1	4
7	Germany (GER)	0	1	0	1
8	Australia (AUS)	0	0	3	3
9	Japan (JPN)	0	0	2	2
10	Mexico (MEX)	0	0	1	1
10	Romania (ROU)	0	0	1	1
10	Sweden (SWE)	0	0	1	1
10	Ukraine (UKR)	0	0	1	1
Totals (13 entries)		17	17	17	51

=== 2021 ===
Rank	Nation	Gold	Silver	Bronze	Total
1	Germany (GER)	5	3	1	9
1	Ukraine (UKR)	5	3	1	9
3	Russia (RUS)	4	6	1	11
4	Italy (ITA)	2	1	5	8
5	Brazil (BRA)	1	0	3	4
6	France (FRA)	1	0	0	1
7	Colombia (COL)	0	3	1	4
8	Sweden (SWE)	0	0	2	2
9	Croatia (CRO)	0	0	1	1
9	South Korea (KOR)	0	0	1	1
9	Spain (ESP)	0	0	1	1
Totals (11 entries)		18	16	17	51

=== 2026 ===
Rank	Nation	Gold	Silver	Bronze	Total
1	Russia (RUS)	7	4	2	13
2	Mexico (MEX)	3	5	4	12
3	China (CHN)	3	3	2	8
4	Germany (GER)	3	1	1	5
5	Canada (CAN)	1	1	2	4
6	Australia (AUS)	0	2	3	5
7	Ukraine (UKR)	0	1	1	2
8	Fiji (FIJ)	0	0	1	1
8	Great Britain (GBR)	0	0	1	1
Totals (9 entries)		17	17	17	51

== See also ==
- FINA World Junior Swimming Championships
- FINA World Junior Synchronised Swimming Championships
- FINA Junior Water Polo World Championships
- FINA World Junior Open Water Swimming Championships
- FINA Diving Grand Prix
