= High diving =

Water sport involving diving from relatively great heights

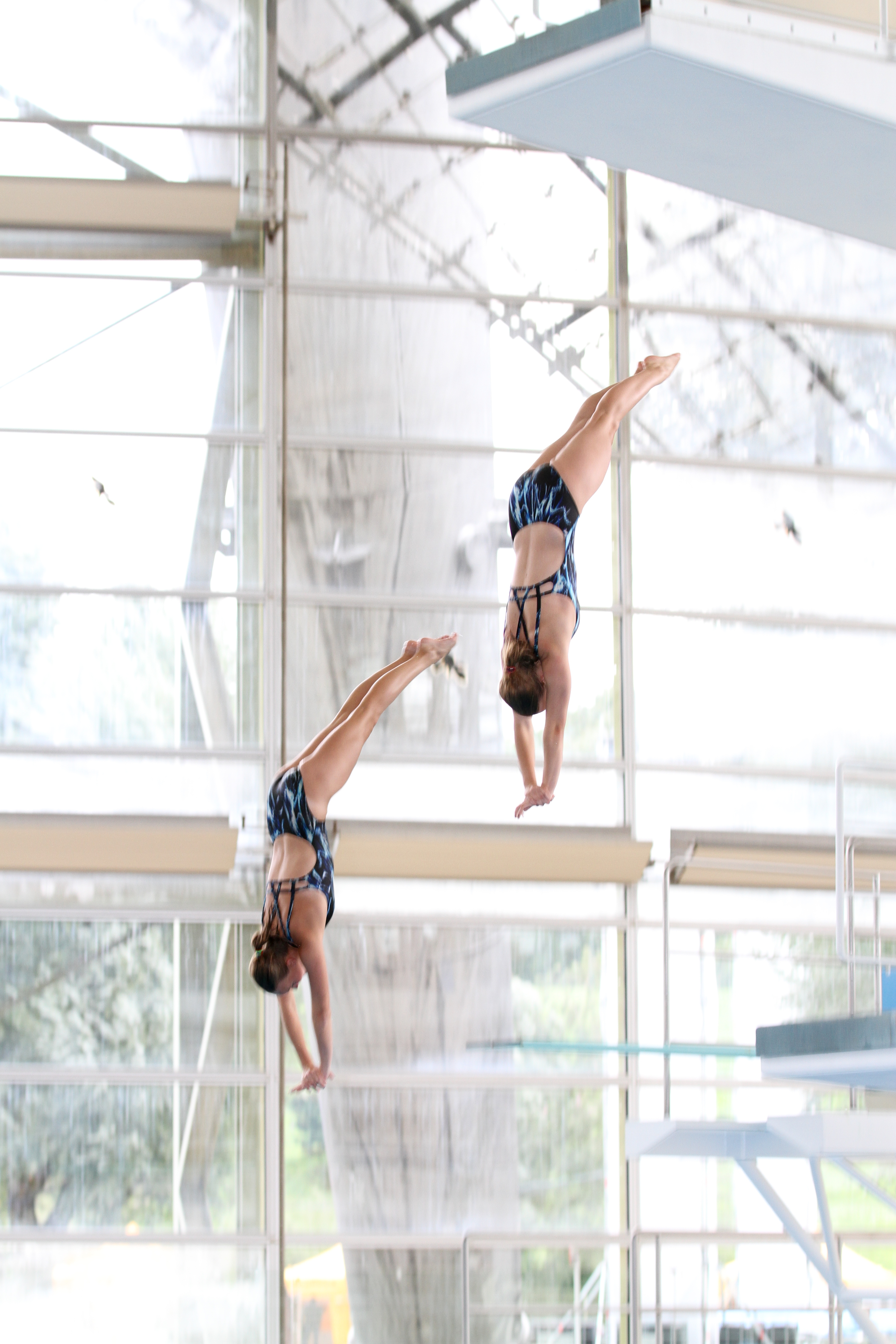
Synchronized high diving

High diving is the act of diving into water from relatively great heights. High diving can be performed as an adventure sport (as with cliff diving), as a performance stunt (as with many records attempts), or competitively during sporting events.

It debuted at a FINA event at the 2013 World Aquatics Championships in Barcelona, after the sport was added to the federation's list of disciplines. In the world championships, men jump from a 27-metre-high (89 ft) platform while women jump from a 20-metre-high (66 ft) platform. In other official competitions, men generally dive from a height of 22–27 metres (72–89 ft) while women dive from a height of 18–23 metres (59–75 ft). The sport is unique in that athletes are often unable to practice in an authentic environment until the days leading up to a competition. High divers have achieved speeds of descent of 96 kilometres per hour (60 mph).

== History ==
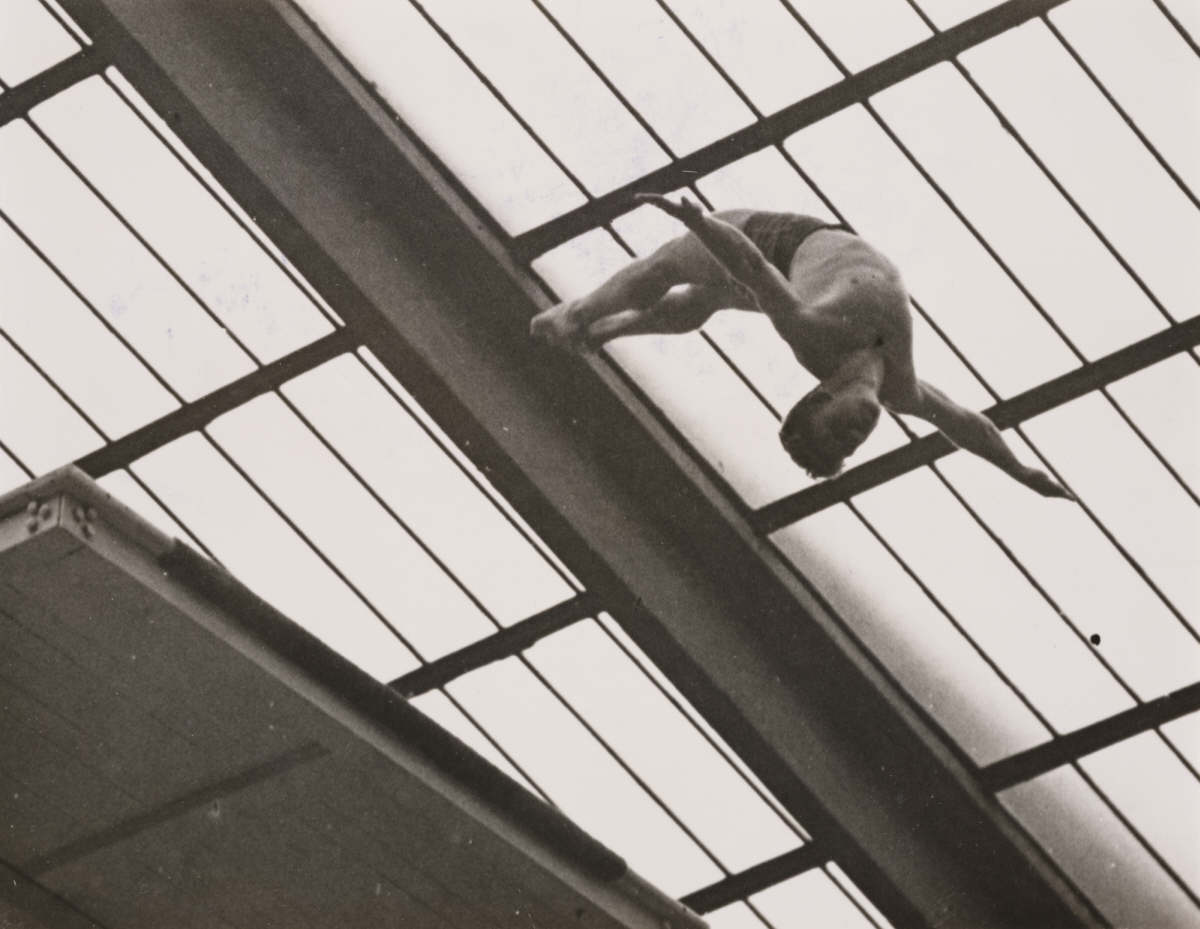
R. M. Stigersand in the Men's High Diving competition, Olympic Games, London, 1948

Initially, diving as a sport began by jumping from "great heights". Then it was exclusively practiced by gymnasts as they found it exciting with a low probability of injury. It then evolved into "diving in the air" with water as the safety landing base. Efforts by Thomas Ralph to name the sport "springing" were not realized, as the term "diving" was by then firmly rooted. It soon became a sporting event pursued by many enthusiasts. In the early years of the sport, finding suitable places to jump was an issue, and people started jumping from any high place – in Europe and the United States they started jumping from bridges, then diving head first into the water. This evolved into "fancy diving" in Europe, and, particularly in Germany and Sweden, as a gymnastic act. The sport further improved with gymnastic acts being performed during the diving process, and was then given the names "springboard diving" and "high fancy diving", which were events in the Olympics of 1908 and 1912. The first diving event as a sport, however, was in 1889 in Scotland with a diving height of 6 feet (1.8 m). Today, in Latin America, diving by professionals from heights of 100 feet (30 m) or more is a common occurrence.

Cliff diving has been documented as far back as 1770 when Kahekili II, king of Maui, engaged in a practice called "lele kawa", which in English means jumping feet first into water from great heights without making a splash. The king's warriors were forced to participate to prove that they were courageous and loyal to the king. The practice later developed into a competition under king Kamehameha I, and divers were judged on their style and amount of splash upon entering the water.

The first female world champion in this sport was Cesilie Carlton of the United States, who won the first gold medal at the 2013 World Aquatics Championships with a total score of 211.60. The first male world champion was Orlando Duque of Colombia who received a score of 590.20.

== Overview ==
=== Pool diving ===
Until 2018, the only permanent regulation-size high diving platform in the world was located in Austria, but it is not used during the winter period. In 2018, Zhaoqing Yingxiong High Diving Training Center, which contains the first year-round regulation-size high diving platform, opened at the Zhaoqing Sports Center in Zhaoqing, China. The training practice is generally done on 10-metre-high (33 ft) platforms. The "competition dives" are collectively put in place in pieces, similar to the way a dress is made. Dives such as five somersault dives can thrill, but some competitors prefer to perform simpler dives.

=== Outdoor diving ===
Some outdoor diving involves launching from significant heights. One such diver noted, "There is adrenaline, excitement, danger – so many different energies go through your mind when you jump off. That goes away and then you hit the water come up and it's a massive elation, you feel such self achievement." A rescue team of scuba divers may be involved in some instances, and are required for any official competitions.

==== Cliff diving ====
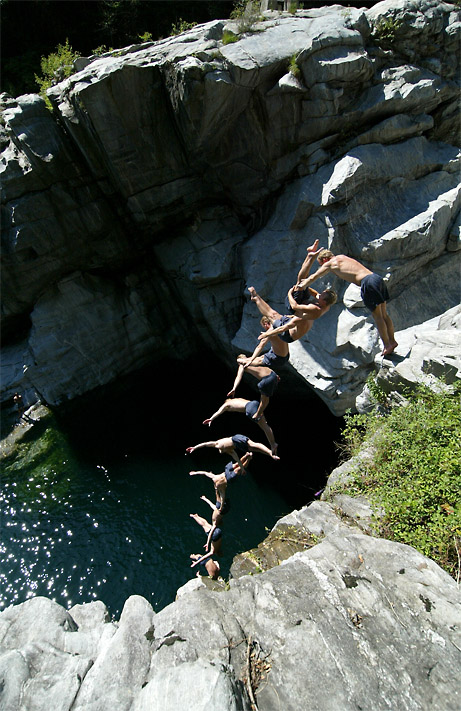
Cliff diving in Switzerland

Cliff divers practice the different components of their dives in isolation and only execute the complete dive during championship competitions. Cliff dives are considered extremely difficult and dangerous, a challenge to every competitor; in addition to the physical challenges, they can be mentally challenging to perform.

== Events ==
Both men and women participate in the High Diving World Championships, but the diving height for women is limited to 20 metres (66 ft). The Red Bull Cliff Diving World Series is held annually and draws crowds of up to 70,000 people. Participants dive from a variety of locations including castles, cliffs, towers, bridges, and the Copenhagen Opera House. Efforts were made by divers to make this sport an Olympic event for the 2024 Summer Olympics held in Paris, France, however the highest platform was the usual 10 metres (33 ft).

== World record high dives ==
There is considerable debate surrounding record claims for the highest dive, which largely revolves around criteria for what constitutes a valid dive. ABC's Wide World of Sports produced world record high dives for its Emmy award-winning sports anthology show for more than a decade. They required contestants to dive or execute at least one somersault and exit the water without the assistance of others. In 1983 Wide World of Sports produced its last World Record High Dive at Sea World in San Diego. Five divers (Rick Charls, Rick Winters, Dana Kunze, Bruce Boccia, and Mike Foley) successfully executed dives from 52 metres (172 ft). In 1985 Randy Dickison dove from 53.24 metres (174 ft 8 in) at Ocean Park in Hong Kong but sustained a broken femur and could not exit the water on his own.

In 1987, Olivier Favre attempted a double back somersault from 54 metres (177 ft) but broke his back upon impact and had to be rescued. Laso Schaller's 2015 jump from a 59 metres (193 ft) cliff in Switzerland may not be considered a dive based on ABC's criteria (one somersault needed); however, he is the current record holder for Highest dive from a diving board according to the Guinness Book of Records, simultaneously holding the Highest Cliff Jump record for the same jump.

=== Men ===
| Date | High diver | Place | Height | Video | Notes |
|---|---|---|---|---|---|
| 1933 | (Netherlands) Lou Vlasblom | De Hef | 67 m (220 ft) | | Unofficial jump, recorded by multiple witnesses. Executed a double somersault but did not exit the water independently. |
| 1982 | (United States) Dave Lindsay | SeaWorld Orlando | 51.8 m (170 ft) | | ABC's Wide World of Sports - World Record High Dive Challenge |
| March 1983 | (United States) Rick Winters | SeaWorld San Diego | 52.4 m (172 ft) | | ABC's Wide World of Sports - World Record High Dive Challenge |
| March 1983 | (United States) Rick Charls | SeaWorld San Diego | 52.4 m (172 ft) | | ABC's Wide World of Sports - World Record High Dive Challenge |
| March 1983 | (United States) Bruce Boccia | SeaWorld San Diego | 52.4 m (172 ft) | | ABC's Wide World of Sports - World Record High Dive Challenge |
| March 1983 | (United States) Mike Foley | SeaWorld San Diego | 52.4 m (172 ft) | | ABC's Wide World of Sports - World Record High Dive Challenge |
| March 1983 | (United States) Dana Kunze | SeaWorld San Diego | 52.4 m (172 ft) | | ABC's Wide World of Sports - World Record High Dive Challenge |
| 7 April 1985 | (United States) Randy Dickison | Ocean Park Hong Kong | 53.2 m (174 ft 8 in) | | Failed attempt, multiple fractures of the left leg prevented diver from exiting the pool unassisted. |
| 30 August 1987 | (Switzerland) Olivier Favre | Villers-le-Lac, France | 53.9 m (177 ft) | | Failed attempt. Broke his back upon impact with water and had to be rescued. |
| 27 September 1997 | (Czech Republic) Rudolf Bok | Žďákov Bridge, Czech republic | 58.28 m (191 ft) | | This was a jump, not a dive. Fracture of the thoracic vertebrae and other internal injuries, no surgery. |
| 4 August 2015 | (Brazil) Laso Schaller | Maggia, Switzerland | 58.8 m (192 ft 10 in) | | Highest dive from a high diving board and Highest Cliff Jump as per Guinness Book of World Records. Internal ligament injury to the knee as a result even though he wore some protection. |

=== Women ===
| Date | High diver | Place | Height | Video | Notes |
|---|---|---|---|---|---|
| 1982 | (United States) Debi Beachel | Rome, Italy | 33.3 m (109 ft 4 in) | | |
| 7 April 1985 | (United States) Lucy Wardle | Ocean Park Hong Kong | 36.8 m (120 ft 9 in) | | |

== Health implications ==
Some research suggests that the impact associated with high diving could have negative effects on the joints and muscles of athletes. To avoid injury to their arms upon impact with the water, divers from significant heights usually enter the water feet first.

=== Impact with water ===
Water resistance increases with the speed of entry, so entering the water at high-velocity induces rapid and potentially dangerous deceleration. In 1989 a 22 year-old, who was "...a member of the Salt Lake Country Club diving team... ...climbed up on a set of towering rocks... ...about 60 feet..." (18.2 metres). The 22 year old dove into the water to perform a back flip, but never surfaced from the water and was found several days later 120 feet under the water after suffering a broken neck from the dive.

| Fall height | Velocity reached at water surface |
|---|---|
| 5 feet (1.5 m) | 12 mph (19 km/h) |
| 10 feet (3.0 m) | 17 mph (27 km/h) |
| 20 feet (6.1 m) | 25 mph (40 km/h) |
| 33 feet (10 m) | 35 mph (56 km/h) |
| 50 feet (15 m) | 38 mph (61 km/h) |
| 85 feet (26 m) | 53–62 mph (85–100 km/h) |

== Image gallery ==
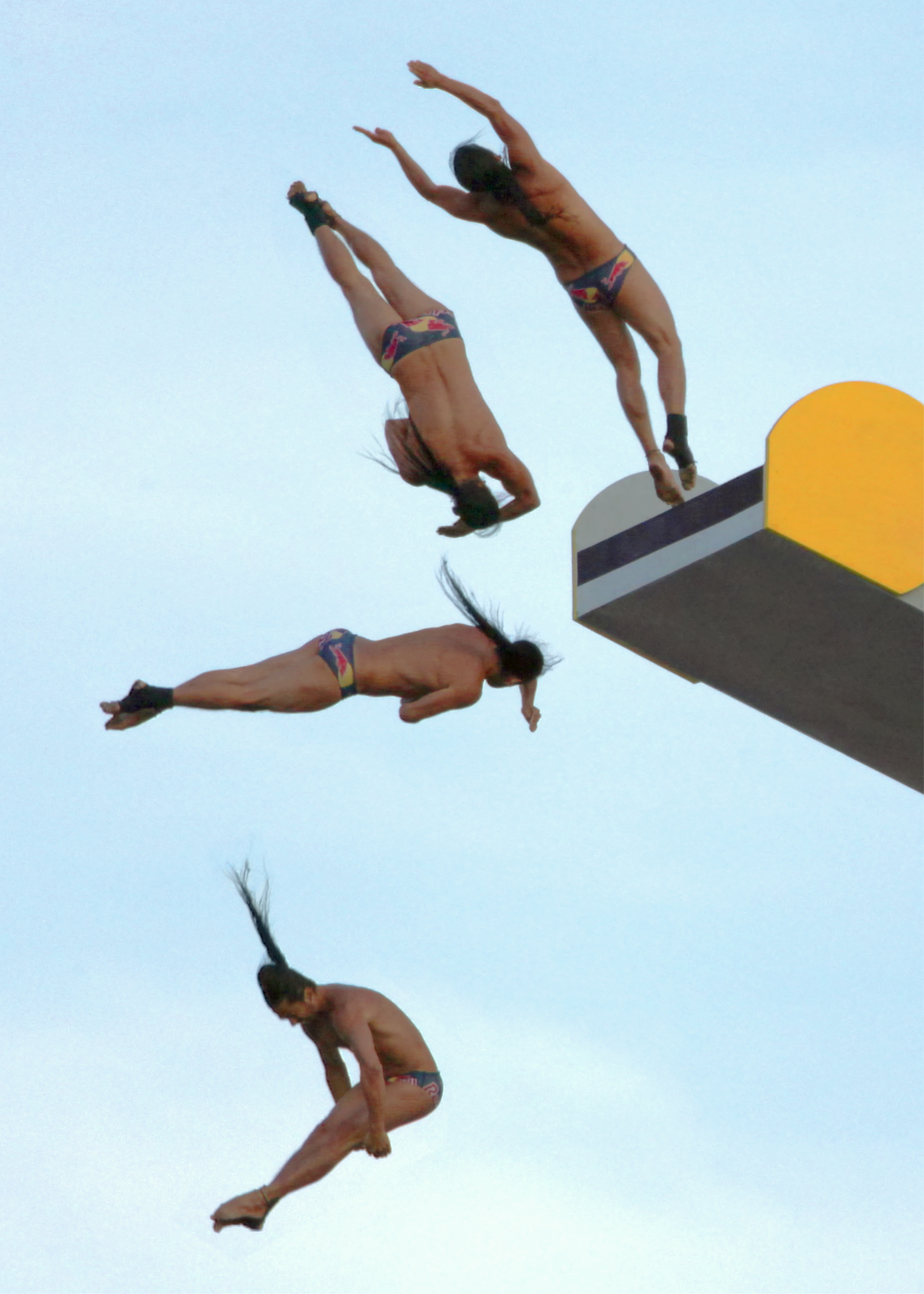
A composite dive from Orlando Duque.

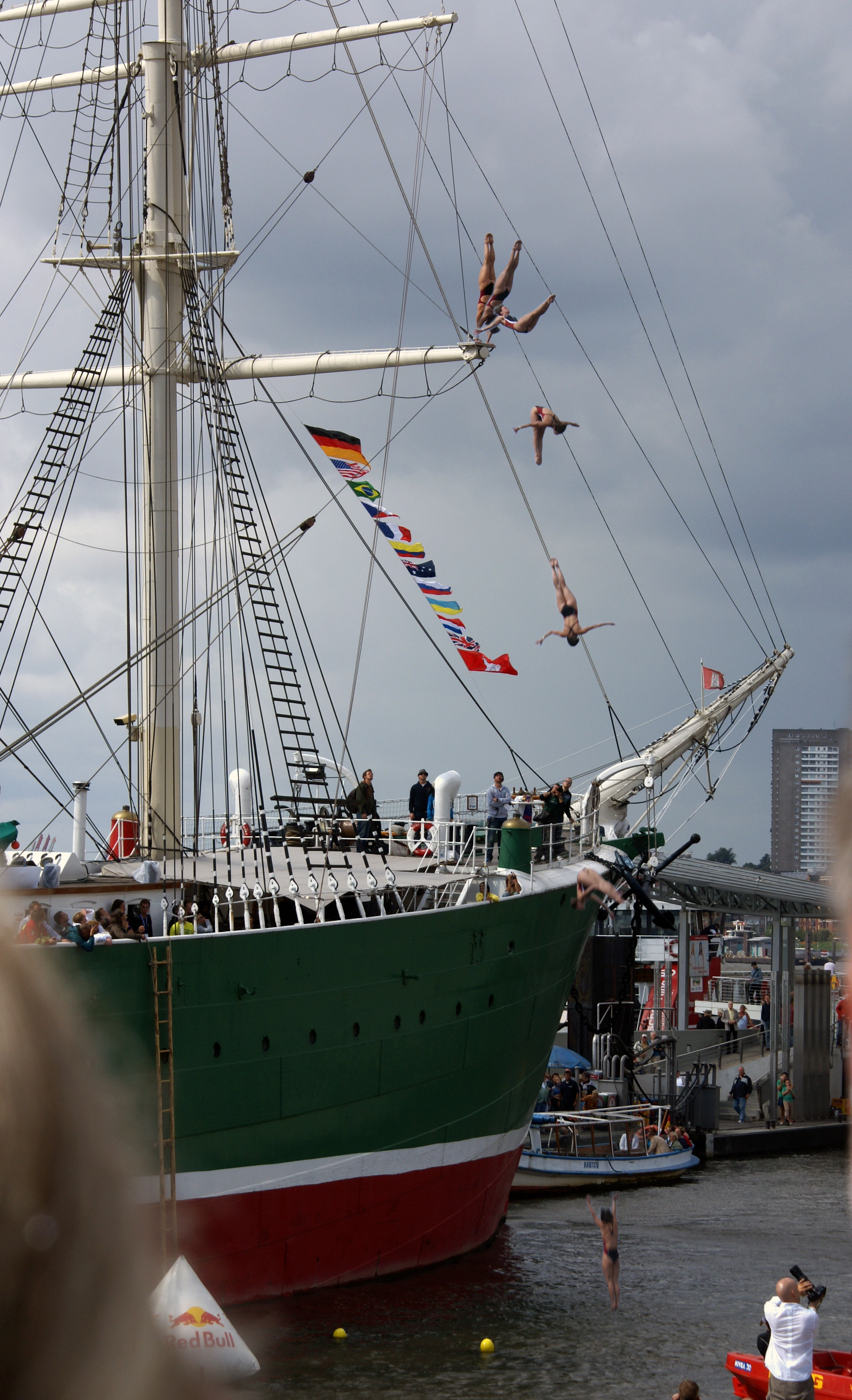
Cliff Diving from the Rickmer Rickmers

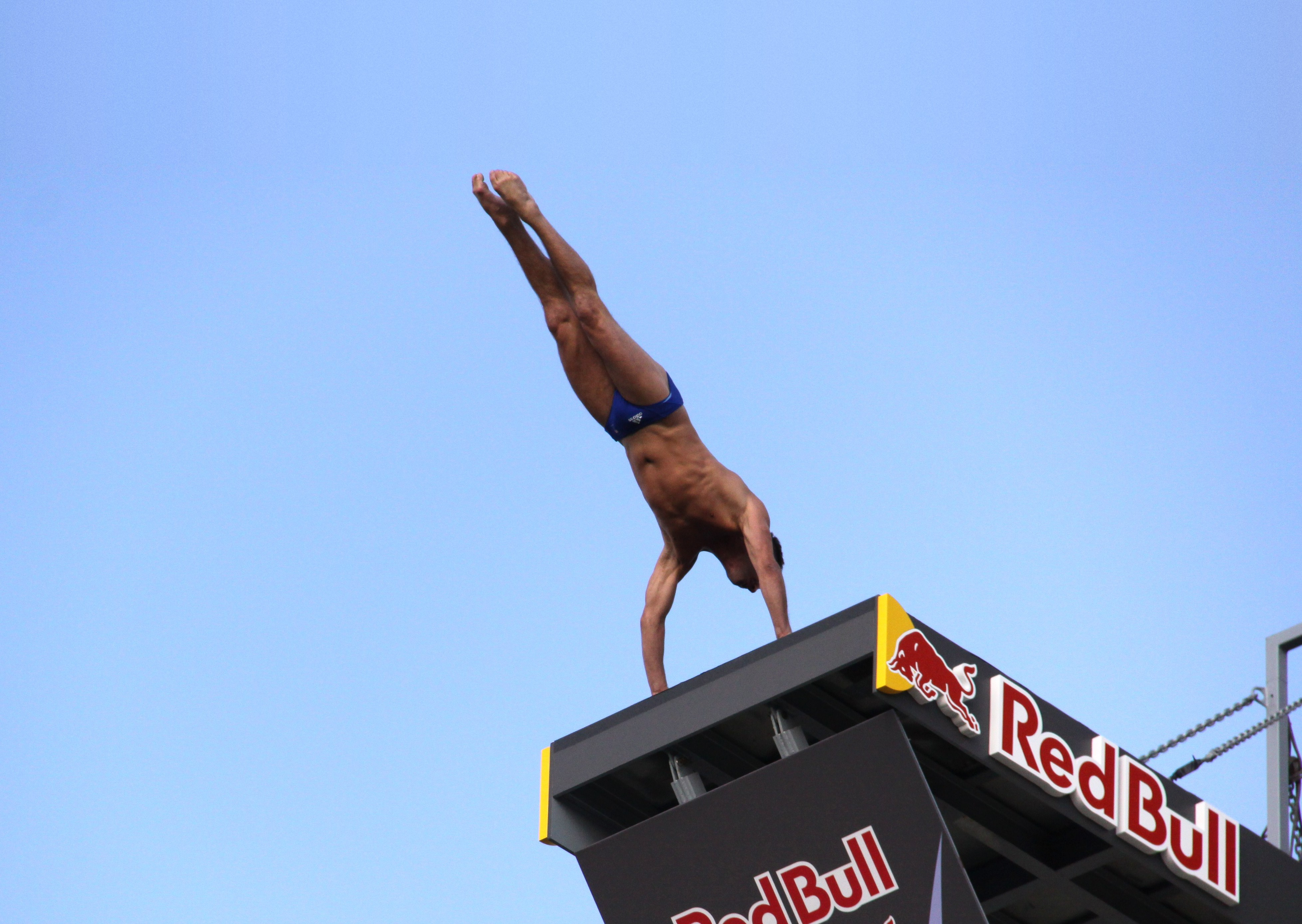
An event in La Rochelle, France.

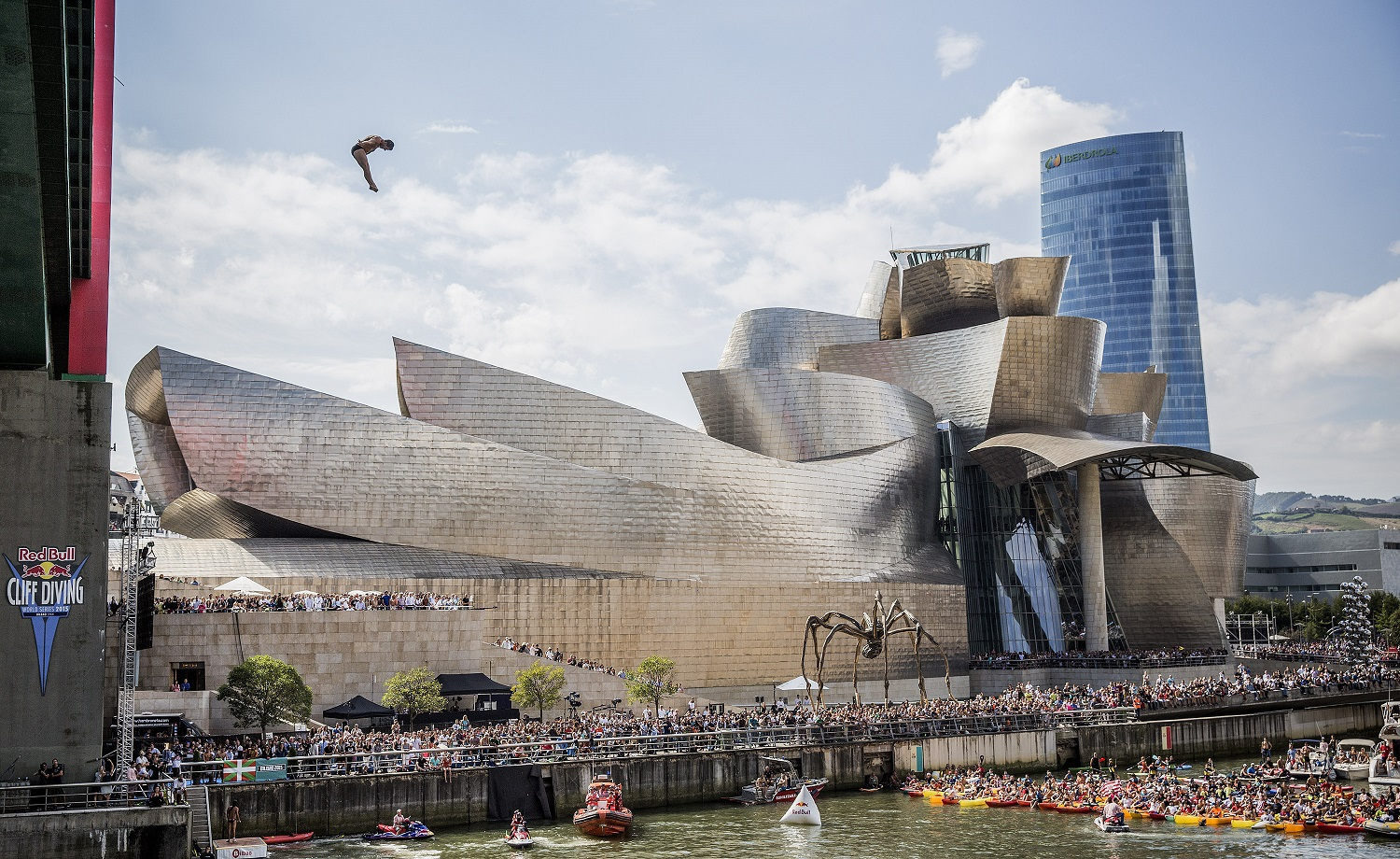
A person dives from the 27.5 metre platform on La Salve bridge.

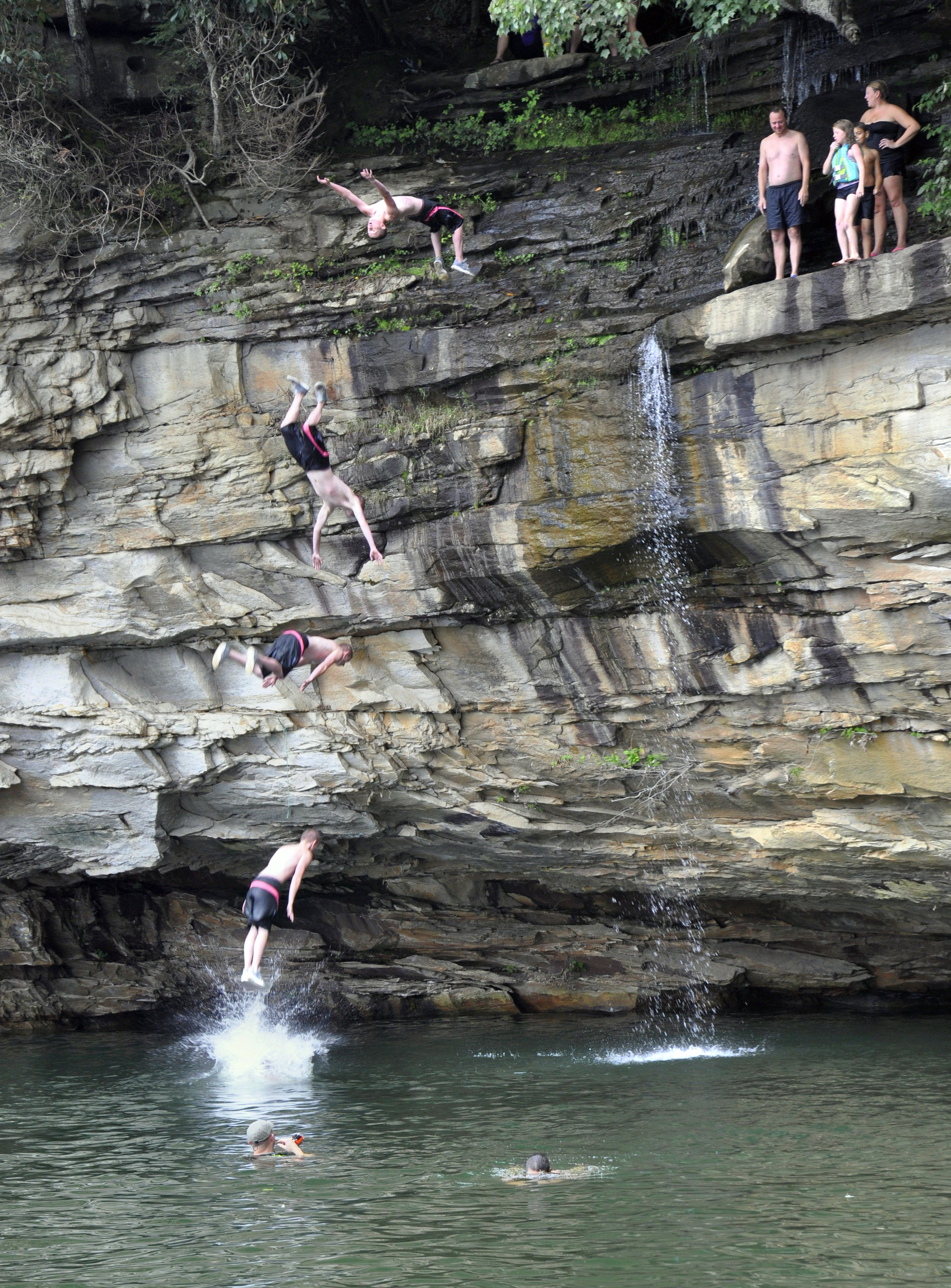
Amateur cliff diving

Rhiannan Iffland - 2017 World Aquatics Championships Budapest

== See also ==
- 2014 FINA High Diving World Cup
- La Quebrada Cliff Divers
- List of World Aquatics Championships medalists in high diving
- Red Bull Cliff Diving World Series – annual international series of cliff diving events that was established in 2009

=== Olympic events ===
- Diving at the 1912 Summer Olympics – Men's plain high diving
- Diving at the 1912 Summer Olympics – Women's plain high diving
- Diving at the 1920 Summer Olympics – Men's plain high diving
- Diving at the 1924 Summer Olympics – Men's plain high diving
