= Sri Lanka at the 2025 World Aquatics Championships =

- Flag of Sri Lanka
- World Aquatics code: SRI
- National federation: Sri Lanka Aquatic Sports Union

in Singapore
- Competitors: 6 in 2 sports
- Medals: Gold 0 Silver 0 Bronze 0 Total 0

World Aquatics Championships appearances
- 1986; 1991; 1994; 1998; 2001; 2003; 2005; 2007; 2009; 2011; 2013; 2015; 2017; 2019; 2022; 2023; 2024; 2025

Other related appearances
- FINA athletes (2015)

Sri Lanka competed at the 2025 World Aquatics Championships in Singapore from July 11 to August 3, 2025.

== Competitors ==
The following is the list of competitors in the Championships.

Sport	Men	Women	Total
Open water swimming	2	1*	3*
Swimming	2	2*	4*
Total	4	2*	6*

- Minagi Rupesinghe competed in both open water swimming and pool swimming.

== Open water swimming ==
Men

Athlete	Event	Heat		Semi-final		Final	
Athlete	Event	Time	Rank	Time	Rank	Time	Rank
Tharusha Perera	Men's 3 km knockout sprints	21:49.9	30	Did not advance			
Tharusha Perera	Men's 5 km	—				1:11:26.6	72
Tharusha Perera	Men's 10 km	—				OTL	
Dilanka Shehan	Men's 5 km	—				1:07:32.5	69
Dilanka Shehan	Men's 10 km	—				OTL	

Women

Athlete	Event	Heat		Semi-final		Final	
Athlete	Event	Time	Rank	Time	Rank	Time	Rank
Minagi Rupesinghe	Women's 5 km	—				1:14:03.2	61

== Swimming ==
Sri Lanka entered 4 swimmers.

Men

Athlete	Event	Heat		Semi-final		Final	
Athlete	Event	Time	Rank	Time	Rank	Time	Rank
Kyle Abeysinghe	50 m freestyle	Did not start		Did not advance			
Kyle Abeysinghe	100 m freestyle	52.36	67	Did not advance			
Binura Thalagala	200 m freestyle	1:58.98	54	Did not advance			
Binura Thalagala	400 m freestyle	4:16.80	43	—		Did not advance	

Women

Athlete	Event	Heat		Semi-final		Final	
Athlete	Event	Time	Rank	Time	Rank	Time	Rank
Hiruki de Silva	100 m freestyle	59.83	49	Did not advance			
Hiruki de Silva	200 m freestyle	2:09.23	41	Did not advance			
Minagi Rupesinghe	100 m backstroke	1:06.91	48	Did not advance			
Minagi Rupesinghe	200 m backstroke	2:23.70	40	Did not advance			
