= List of World Aquatics Championships medalists in high diving =

This is a complete list of the World Aquatics Championships medalists in high diving.

== Men ==
Bold numbers in brackets denotes record number of victories.

Games	Gold	Silver	Bronze
2013 Barcelona	Orlando Duque; Colombia	Gary Hunt; Great Britain	Jonathan Paredes; Mexico
2015 Kazan	Gary Hunt; Great Britain	Jonathan Paredes; Mexico	Artem Silchenko; Russia
2017 Budapest	Steve Lo Bue; United States	Michal Navrátil; Czech Republic	Alessandro De Rose; Italy
2019 Gwangju	Gary Hunt (2); Great Britain	Steve Lo Bue; United States	Jonathan Paredes; Mexico
2023 Fukuoka	Constantin Popovici; Romania	Cătălin Preda; Romania	Gary Hunt; France
2024 Doha	Aidan Heslop; Great Britain	Gary Hunt; France	Cătălin Preda; Romania
2025 Singapore	James Lichtenstein; United States	Carlos Gimeno; Spain	Constantin Popovici; Romania

Medal table

Rank	Nation	Gold	Silver	Bronze	Total
1	Great Britain	3	1	0	4
2	United States	2	1	0	3
3	Romania	1	1	2	4
4	Colombia	1	0	0	1
5	Mexico	0	1	2	3
6	France	0	1	1	2
7	Czech Republic	0	1	0	1
7	Spain	0	1	0	1
9	Italy	0	0	1	1
9	Russia	0	0	1	1
Totals (10 entries)		7	7	7	21

== Women ==
Bold numbers in brackets denotes record number of victories.

Games	Gold	Silver	Bronze
2013 Barcelona	Cesilie Carlton; United States	Ginger Huber; United States	Anna Bader; Germany
2015 Kazan	Rachelle Simpson; United States	Cesilie Carlton; United States	Yana Nestsiarava; Belarus
2017 Budapest	Rhiannan Iffland; Australia	Adriana Jiménez; Mexico	Yana Nestsiarava; Belarus
2019 Gwangju	Rhiannan Iffland; Australia	Adriana Jiménez; Mexico	Jessica Macaulay; Great Britain
2023 Fukuoka	Rhiannan Iffland; Australia	Molly Carlson; Canada	Jessica Macaulay; Canada
2024 Doha	Rhiannan Iffland; Australia	Molly Carlson; Canada	Jessica Macaulay; Canada
2025 Singapore	Rhiannan Iffland (5); Australia	Simone Leathead; Canada	Maya Kelly; United States

Medal table

Rank	Nation	Gold	Silver	Bronze	Total
1	Australia	5	0	0	5
2	United States	2	2	1	5
3	Canada	0	3	2	5
4	Mexico	0	2	0	2
5	Belarus	0	0	2	2
6	Germany	0	0	1	1
6	Great Britain	0	0	1	1
Totals (7 entries)		7	7	7	21

== Overall medal table ==
After the 2025 World Aquatics Championships.

Rank	Nation	Gold	Silver	Bronze	Total
1	Australia	5	0	0	5
2	United States	4	3	1	8
3	Great Britain	3	1	1	5
4	Romania	1	1	2	4
5	Colombia	1	0	0	1
6	Canada	0	3	2	5
6	Mexico	0	3	2	5
8	France	0	1	1	2
9	Czech Republic	0	1	0	1
9	Spain	0	1	0	1
11	Belarus	0	0	2	2
12	Germany	0	0	1	1
12	Italy	0	0	1	1
12	Russia	0	0	1	1
Totals (14 entries)		14	14	14	42
