= Brazil at the World Aquatics Championships =

- Flag of Brazil
- World Aquatics code: BRA
- National federation: Confederação Brasileira de Desportos Aquáticos
- Website: www.cbda.org.br
- Medals Ranked 15th: Gold 17 Silver 15 Bronze 19 Total 51

World Aquatics Championships appearances (overview)
- 1973; 1975; 1978; 1982; 1986; 1991; 1994; 1998; 2001; 2003; 2005; 2007; 2009; 2011; 2013; 2015; 2017; 2019; 2022; 2023; 2024; 2025

Brazil has participated in all the World Aquatics Championships since the beginning in 1973. Brazil is 14th on the all time medal table. Brazil's first World Championships medal was won by Rômulo Arantes in the Men's 100 m backstroke in West Berlin in 1978. He won bronze. Ricardo Prado won the first Brazil's gold medal in Men's 400 m individual medley in Guayaquil, Ecuador in 1982. Poliana Okimoto was the first woman to win a medal, a bronze in women's 5 km in Rome in 2009. Ana Marcela Cunha was the first woman to win a gold medal in women's 25 km in Shanghai in 2011.

== Medalists ==
=== Swimming ===
Updated until the 2024 World Championships.

Medal	Name	Year	Event
Bronze	Rômulo Arantes	1978 West Berlin	Men's 100 m backstroke
Gold	Ricardo Prado	1982 Guayaquil	Men's 400 m individual medley
Bronze	Gustavo Borges	1994 Rome	Men's 100 m freestyle
Bronze	André Teixeira, Fernando Scherer, Gustavo Borges, Teófilo Ferreira	1994 Rome	Men's 4 × 100 m freestyle relay
Gold	César Cielo	2009 Rome	Men's 50 m freestyle
Gold	César Cielo	2009 Rome	Men's 100 m freestyle
Silver	Felipe França Silva	2009 Rome	Men's 50 m breaststroke
Gold	César Cielo	2011 Shanghai	Men's 50 m freestyle
Gold	César Cielo	2011 Shanghai	Men's 50 m butterfly
Gold	Felipe França Silva	2011 Shanghai	Men's 50 m breaststroke
Gold	César Cielo	2013 Barcelona	Men's 50 m freestyle
Gold	César Cielo	2013 Barcelona	Men's 50 m butterfly
Bronze	Felipe Lima	2013 Barcelona	Men's 100 m breaststroke
Bronze	Thiago Pereira	2013 Barcelona	Men's 200 m individual medley
Bronze	Thiago Pereira	2013 Barcelona	Men's 400 m individual medley
Silver	Nicholas Santos	2015 Kazan	Men's 50 m butterfly
Silver	Thiago Pereira	2015 Kazan	Men's 200 m individual medley
Silver	Etiene Medeiros	2015 Kazan	Women's 50 m backstroke
Bronze	Bruno Fratus	2015 Kazan	Men's 50 m freestyle
Gold	Etiene Medeiros	2017 Budapest	Women's 50 m backstroke
Silver	Marcelo Chierighini, César Cielo, Bruno Fratus, Gabriel Santos	2017 Budapest	Men's 4 × 100 m freestyle relay
Silver	Nicholas Santos	2017 Budapest	Men's 50 m butterfly
Silver	João Gomes Júnior	2017 Budapest	Men's 50 m breaststroke
Silver	Bruno Fratus	2017 Budapest	Men's 50 m freestyle
Silver	Felipe Lima	2019 Gwangju	Men's 50 m breaststroke
Silver	Etiene Medeiros	2019 Gwangju	Women's 50 m backstroke
Silver	Bruno Fratus	2019 Gwangju	Men's 50 m freestyle
Bronze	Nicholas Santos	2019 Gwangju	Men's 50 m butterfly
Bronze	João Gomes Júnior	2019 Gwangju	Men's 50 m breaststroke
Silver	Nicholas Santos	2022 Budapest	Men's 50 m butterfly
Bronze	Guilherme Costa	2022 Budapest	Men's 400 metre freestyle

=== Open water swimming ===
Updated until the 2024 World Championships.

Medal	Name	Year	Event
Bronze	Poliana Okimoto	2009 Rome	Women's 5 km
Gold	Ana Marcela Cunha	2011 Shanghai	Women's 25 km
Gold	Poliana Okimoto	2013 Barcelona	Women's 10 km
Silver	Ana Marcela Cunha	2013 Barcelona	Women's 10 km
Silver	Poliana Okimoto	2013 Barcelona	Women's 5 km
Bronze	Ana Marcela Cunha	2013 Barcelona	Women's 5 km
Bronze	Allan do Carmo, Samuel de Bona, Poliana Okimoto	2013 Barcelona	Team
Gold	Ana Marcela Cunha	2015 Kazan	Women's 25 km
Silver	Allan do Carmo, Diogo Villarinho, Ana Marcela Cunha	2015 Kazan	Team
Bronze	Ana Marcela Cunha	2015 Kazan	Women's 10 km
Gold	Ana Marcela Cunha	2017 Budapest	Women's 25 km
Bronze	Ana Marcela Cunha	2017 Budapest	Women's 5 km
Bronze	Ana Marcela Cunha	2017 Budapest	Women's 10 km
Gold	Ana Marcela Cunha	2019 Gwangju	Women's 5 km
Gold	Ana Marcela Cunha	2019 Gwangju	Women's 25 km
Gold	Ana Marcela Cunha	2022 Budapest	Women's 5 km
Gold	Ana Marcela Cunha	2022 Budapest	Women's 25 km
Bronze	Ana Marcela Cunha	2022 Budapest	Women's 10 km
Bronze	Ana Marcela Cunha	2023 Fukuoka	Women's 5 km
Bronze	Ana Marcela Cunha	2024 Doha	Women's 5 km

== Medal tables ==
=== By championships ===
Year	Gold	Silver	Bronze	Total
(China) 2011 Shanghai	4	0	0	4
(Spain) 2013 Barcelona	3	2	5	10
(Hungary) 2017 Budapest	2	4	2	8
(South Korea) 2019 Gwangju	2	3	2	7
(Hungary) 2022 Budapest	2	1	2	5
(Italy) 2009 Rome	2	1	1	4
(Russia) 2015 Kazan	1	4	2	7
(Ecuador) 1982 Guayaquil	1	0	0	1
(Italy) 1994 Rome	0	0	2	2
(West Germany) 1978 West Berlin	0	0	1	1
(Japan) 2023 Fukuoka	0	0	1	1
(Qatar) 2024 Doha	0	0	1	1
(Socialist Federal Republic of Yugoslavia) 1973 Belgrade	0	0	0	0
(Colombia) 1975 Cali	0	0	0	0
(Spain) 1986 Madrid	0	0	0	0
(Australia) 1991 Perth	0	0	0	0
(Australia) 1998 Perth	0	0	0	0
(Japan) 2001 Fukuoka	0	0	0	0
(Spain) 2003 Barcelona	0	0	0	0
(Canada) 2005 Montreal	0	0	0	0
(Australia) 2007 Melbourne	0	0	0	0
Totals (21 entries)	17	15	19	51

=== By event ===
Event	Gold	Silver	Bronze	Total
Swimming	9	12	10	31
Open water swimming	8	3	9	20
Artistic swimming	0	0	0	0
Diving	0	0	0	0
High diving	0	0	0	0
Water polo	0	0	0	0
Totals (6 entries)	17	15	19	51

=== By gender ===
Gender	Gold	Silver	Bronze	Total
Women	9	6	9	24
Men	8	8	9	25
Mixed	0	1	1	2
Totals (3 entries)	17	15	19	51

=== By athlete ===
Athlete	Gold	Silver	Bronze	Total
Ana Marcela Cunha	7	2	7	16
César Cielo	6	1	0	7
Etiene Medeiros	1	2	0	3
Poliana Okimoto	1	1	2	4
Bruno Fratus	0	3	1	4
Nicholas Santos	0	3	1	4
Thiago Pereira	0	1	2	3
Totals (7 entries)	15	13	13	41

Only athletes with at least three medals

== Best Finishes ==
=== Swimming ===
Updated until the 2024 World Championships.

Event	Gold	Silver	Bronze	Total	Best finish
Men's 50 metre freestyle	3	2	1	6	(gold) (2009, 2011, 2013)
Men's 100 metre freestyle	1	0	1	2	(gold) (2009)
Men's 200 metre freestyle	0	0	0	0	8th (1998, 2024)
Men's 400 metre freestyle	0	0	1	1	(bronze) (2022)
Men's 800 metre freestyle	0	0	0	0	5th (2022)
Men's 1500 metre freestyle	0	0	0	0	6th (1998, 2022)
Men's 50 metre backstroke	0	0	0	0	6th (2013)
Men's 100 metre backstroke	0	0	1	1	(bronze) (1978)
Men's 200 metre backstroke	0	0	0	0	8th (1982)
Men's 50 metre breaststroke	1	3	1	5	(gold) (2011)
Men's 100 metre breaststroke	0	0	1	1	(bronze) (2013)
Men's 200 metre breaststroke	0	0	0	0	7th (2009)
Men's 50 metre butterfly	2	3	1	6	(gold) (2011, 2013)
Men's 100 metre butterfly	0	0	0	0	7th (2005)
Men's 200 metre butterfly	0	0	0	0	4th (1982, 2009)
Men's 200 metre individual medley	0	1	1	2	(silver) (2015)
Men's 400 metre individual medley	1	0	1	2	(gold) (1982)
Men's 4 × 100 metre freestyle relay	0	1	1	2	(silver) (2017)
Men's 4 × 200 metre freestyle relay	0	0	0	0	4th (2022)
Men's 4 × 100 metre medley relay	0	0	0	0	4th (2009)
Women's 50 metre freestyle	0	0	0	0	12th (2005)
Women's 100 metre freestyle	0	0	0	0	6th (2024)
Women's 200 metre freestyle	0	0	0	0	5th (2024)
Women's 400 metre freestyle	0	0	0	0	4th (2024)
Women's 800 metre freestyle	0	0	0	0	8th (2022)
Women's 1500 metre freestyle	0	0	0	0	6th (2022)
Women's 50 metre backstroke	1	2	0	3	(gold) (2017)
Women's 100 metre backstroke	0	0	0	0	9th (2015)
Women's 200 metre backstroke	0	0	0	0	16th (1998)
Women's 50 metre breaststroke	0	0	0	0	8th (2022)
Women's 100 metre breaststroke	0	0	0	0	16th (1973)
Women's 200 metre breaststroke	0	0	0	0	7th (2024)
Women's 50 metre butterfly	0	0	0	0	8th (2009)
Women's 100 metre butterfly	0	0	0	0	5th (2009)
Women's 200 metre butterfly	0	0	0	0	16th (2013, 2015)
Women's 200 metre individual medley	0	0	0	0	10th (2005, 2017)
Women's 400 metre individual medley	0	0	0	0	11th (1978, 2017)
Women's 4 × 100 metre freestyle relay	0	0	0	0	6th (2022, 2024)
Women's 4 × 200 metre freestyle relay	0	0	0	0	4th (2024)
Women's 4 × 100 metre medley relay	0	0	0	0	8th (2009)
Mixed 4 × 100 metre freestyle relay	0	0	0	0	6th (2015, 2022, 2023)
Mixed 4 × 100 metre medley relay	0	0	0	0	9th (2015, 2022)

=== Open water swimming ===
Updated until the 2024 World Championships.

Event	Gold	Silver	Bronze	Total	Best finish
Men's 3 km knockout sprints	0	0	0	0	25th (2025)
Men's 5 km	0	0	0	0	5th (2017)
Men's 10 km	0	0	0	0	7th (2013)
Men's 25 km	0	0	0	0	5th (2013)
Women's 3 km knockout sprints	0	0	0	0	12th (2025)
Women's 5 km	2	1	3	6	(gold) (2019, 2022)
Women's 10 km	1	1	3	5	(gold) (2013)
Women's 25 km	5	0	0	5	(gold) (2011, 2015, 2017, 2019, 2022)
Mixed Team 5 km	0	1	1	2	(silver) (2015)

=== Diving ===
Updated until the 2024 World Championships.

Event	Gold	Silver	Bronze	Total	Best finish
Men's 1 m springboard	0	0	0	0	10th (2003)
Men's 3 m springboard	0	0	0	0	5th (2009)
Men's 10 m platform	0	0	0	0	9th (2023)
Men's Synchro 3 m springboard	0	0	0	0	8th (2005)
Men's Synchro 10 m platform	0	0	0	0	9th (2022)
Women's 1 m springboard	0	0	0	0	8th (2005)
Women's 3 m springboard	0	0	0	0	14th (2022)
Women's 10 m platform	0	0	0	0	4th (2022)
Women's Synchro 3 m springboard	0	0	0	0	10th (2022)
Women's Synchro 10 m platform	0	0	0	0	15th (2015)
Mixed Synchro 3 m springboard	0	0	0	0	12th (2022)
Mixed Synchro 10 m platform	0	0	0	0	8th (2019)

=== Water polo ===
Updated until the 2024 World Championships.

Event	Gold	Silver	Bronze	Total	Best finish
Men's team	0	0	0	0	10th (2015)
Women's team	0	0	0	0	8th (1991)

=== High diving ===
Updated until the 2024 World Championships.

Event	Gold	Silver	Bronze	Total	Best finish
Men's high diving	0	0	0	0	10th (2017)
Women's high diving	0	0	0	0	8th (2015, 2017, 2023)

== See also ==
- Brazil at the FINA World Swimming Championships (25 m)
- Brazil at the Olympics
- Brazil at the Pan American Games
