= Vanuatu at the 2025 World Aquatics Championships =

- Flag of Vanuatu
- World Aquatics code: VAN
- National federation: Vanuatu Aquatics Federation
- Website: vanuatuaquatics.com

in Singapore
- Competitors: 2 in 1 sport
- Medals: Gold 0 Silver 0 Bronze 0 Total 0

World Aquatics Championships appearances
- 2019; 2022; 2023; 2024; 2025

Vanuatu competed at the 2025 World Aquatics Championships in Singapore from July 11 to August 3, 2025.

== Competitors ==
The following is the list of competitors in the Championships.

Sport	Men	Women	Total
Swimming	1	1	2
Total	1	1	2

== Swimming ==
Vanuatu entered 2 swimmers.

Men

Athlete	Event	Heat		Semi-final		Final	
Athlete	Event	Time	Rank	Time	Rank	Time	Rank
Leo Lebot	100 m freestyle	59.58	98	Did not advance			
Leo Lebot	50 m butterfly	29.28	92	Did not advance			

Women

Athlete	Event	Heat		Semi-final		Final	
Athlete	Event	Time	Rank	Time	Rank	Time	Rank
Loane Russet	100 m freestyle	1:03.13	68	Did not advance			
Loane Russet	50 m butterfly	30.69	70	Did not advance			
