= High diving at the 2017 World Aquatics Championships – Women =

Women at the 2017 World Aquatics Championships
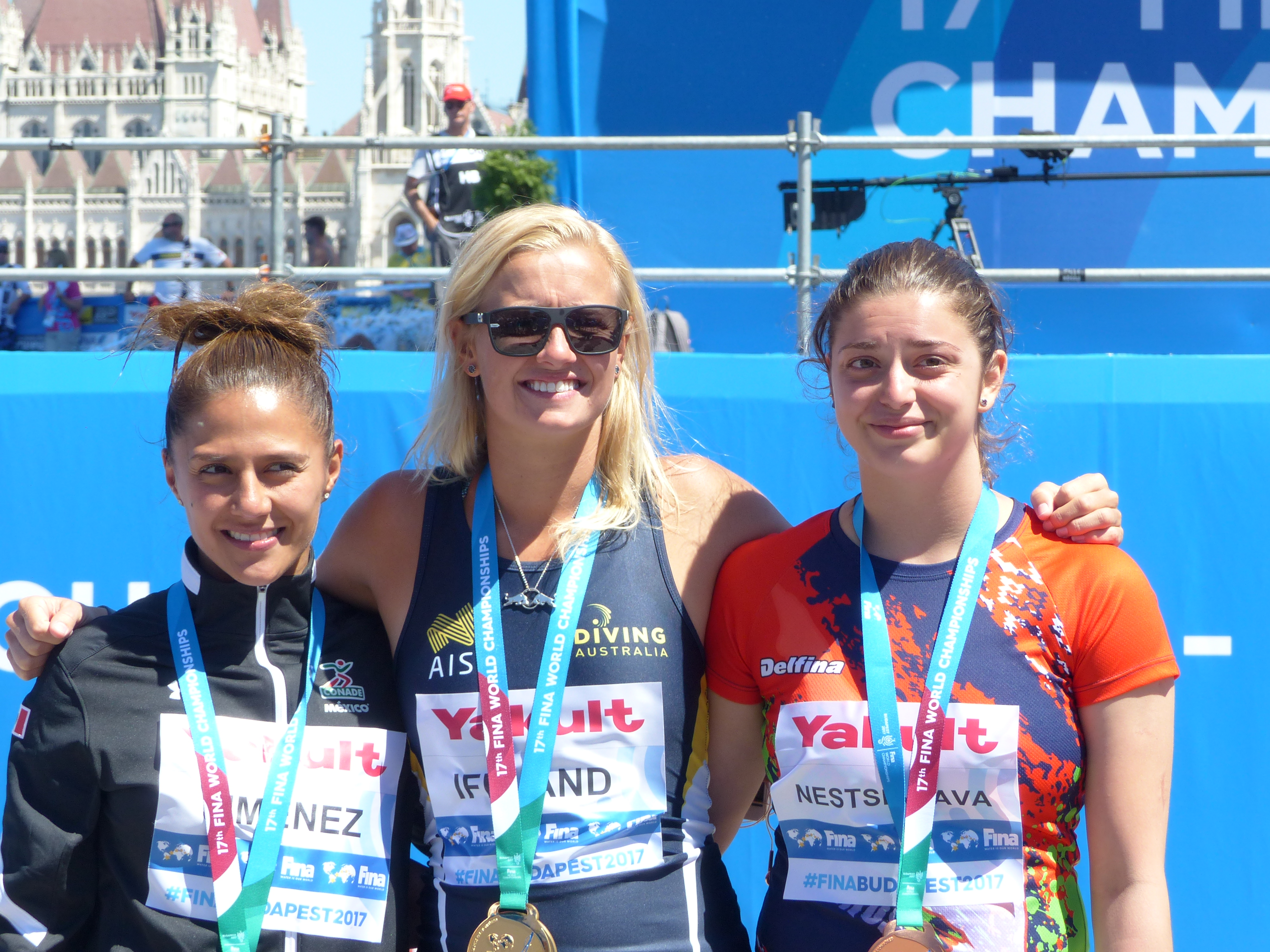
- The podium.
- Venue: Batthyány square
- Location: Budapest, Hungary
- Dates: 28 July (Round 1); 29 July (Round 2–4)
- Competitors: 10 from 6 nations
- Winning points: 320.70

Medalists
gold medal	Rhiannan Iffland	Australia
silver medal	Adriana Jiménez	Mexico
bronze medal	Yana Nestsiarava	Belarus

The Women competition at the 2017 World Championships was held on 28 and 29 July 2017.

== Results ==
The first round was held on 28 July at 12:30. The second to fourth round was held on 29 July at 12:15.

Rank	Diver	Nationality	Round 1	Round 2	Round 3	Round 4	Total
1st place, gold medalist(s)	Rhiannan Iffland	Australia	66.30	66.30	91.20	96.90	320.70
2nd place, silver medalist(s)	Adriana Jiménez	Mexico	66.30	62.40	70.20	110.00	308.90
3rd place, bronze medalist(s)	Yana Nestsiarava	Belarus	62.40	62.40	83.60	95.55	303.95
4	Tara Tira	United States	66.30	68.90	73.10	91.20	299.50
5	Anna Bader	Germany	67.60	63.70	66.30	85.80	283.40
6	Cesilie Carlton	United States	62.40	54.60	66.30	87.40	270.70
7	Helena Merten	Australia	62.40	65.00	64.35	75.60	267.35
8	Jacqueline Valente	Brazil	57.20	53.30	48.30	94.60	253.40
9	Ginger Huber	United States	53.30	66.30	47.50	79.80	246.90
10	Iris Schmidbauer	Germany	48.10	52.00	59.20	58.90	218.20
