= High diving at the 2015 World Aquatics Championships – Women =

Women's high diving at the 2015 World Aquatics Championships
- Dates: 4 August
- Competitors: 10 from 7 nations
- Winning points: 258.70

Medalists
gold medal	Rachelle Simpson	United States
silver medal	Cesilie Carlton	United States
bronze medal	Yana Nestsiarava	Belarus

The women's competition of the high diving events at the 2015 World Aquatics Championships was held on 4 August 2015. The competition was divided into three rounds with jumps of 20m.

== Results ==
Round 1–2 was held at 14:00. Round 3 was held at 15:00.

Rank	Diver	Nationality	Round 1	Round 2	Round 3	Total
1st place, gold medalist(s)	Rachelle Simpson	United States	59.80	96.90	102.00	258.70
2nd place, silver medalist(s)	Cesilie Carlton	United States	62.40	83.30	91.65	237.35
3rd place, bronze medalist(s)	Yana Nestsiarava	Belarus	62.40	83.30	87.40	233.10
4	Adriana Jiménez	Mexico	46.80	90.00	88.40	225.20
5	Lysanne Richard	Canada	68.90	57.35	90.10	216.35
6	Ginger Huber	United States	66.30	69.70	77.70	213.70
7	Anna Bader	Germany	63.70	70.30	60.00	194.00
8	Jacqueline Valente	Brazil	50.70	79.80	56.10	186.60
9	Tara Tira	United States	50.70	54.25	74.80	179.75
	Diana Tomilina	Ukraine				DNS
