= High diving at the 2019 World Aquatics Championships – Women =

Women at the 2019 World Aquatics Championships
- Venue: Chosun University University Football Field
- Location: Gwangju, South Korea
- Dates: 22–23 July
- Competitors: 13 from 11 nations
- Winning points: 298.05

Medalists
gold medal	Rhiannan Iffland	Australia
silver medal	Adriana Jiménez	Mexico
bronze medal	Jessica Macaulay	Great Britain

The Women competition at the 2019 World Aquatics Championships was held on 22 and 23 July 2019.

== Results ==
The first two rounds were held on 22 July at 11:30. The last two round were started on 23 July at 12:00.

Rank	Diver	Nationality	Round 1	Round 2	Round 3	Round 4	Total
1st place, gold medalist(s)	Rhiannan Iffland	Australia	66.30	66.65	66.30	98.80	298.05
2nd place, silver medalist(s)	Adriana Jiménez	Mexico	54.60	93.60	63.70	86.00	297.90
3rd place, bronze medalist(s)	Jessica Macaulay	Great Britain	55.90	90.00	63.70	85.80	295.40
4	Genevieve Bradley	United States	62.40	81.60	62.40	74.40	280.80
5	Antonina Vyshyvanova	Ukraine	46.80	77.55	58.50	74.80	257.65
6	Xantheia Pennisi	Australia	41.60	84.00	54.60	68.40	248.60
7	María Quintero	Colombia	49.40	89.30	50.70	57.40	246.80
8	Iris Schmidbauer	Germany	45.50	60.80	52.00	75.25	233.55
9	Jacqueline Valente	Brazil	53.30	60.20	42.90	67.20	223.60
10	Ellie Smart	United States	58.50	28.50	54.60	68.25	209.85
11	Aimee Harrison	Canada	53.30	55.80	44.20	52.70	206.00
12	Celia Fernández	Spain	41.60	49.95	54.60	54.25	200.40
	Yana Nestsiarava	Belarus	57.20	51.30	DNS		
