= Sri Lanka at the 2024 World Aquatics Championships =

- Flag of Sri Lanka
- FINA code: SRI
- National federation: Sri Lanka Aquatic Sports Union

in Doha, Qatar
- Competitors: 6 in 3 sports
- Medals: Gold 0 Silver 0 Bronze 0 Total 0

World Aquatics Championships appearances
- 1986; 1991; 1994; 1998; 2001; 2003; 2005; 2007; 2009; 2011; 2013; 2015; 2017; 2019; 2022; 2023; 2024

Other related appearances
- FINA athletes (2015)

Sri Lanka competed at the 2024 World Aquatics Championships in Doha, Qatar from 2 to 18 February.

== Competitors ==
The following is the list of competitors in the Championships.

Sport	Men	Women	Total
Diving	1	0	1
Open water swimming	1	0	1
Swimming	2	2	4
Total	4	2	6

== Diving ==
Men

Athlete	Event	Preliminaries		Semifinals		Final	
Athlete	Event	Points	Rank	Points	Rank	Points	Rank
Dulanjan Fernando	1 m springboard	150.40	44	—		Did not advance	
Dulanjan Fernando	3 m springboard	180.25	68	Did not advance			

== Open water swimming ==
Men

Athlete	Event	Time	Rank
Dilanka Shehan	Men's 5 km	1:00:42.9	66

== Swimming ==
Sri Lanka entered 4 swimmers.

Men

Athlete	Event	Heat		Semifinal		Final	
Athlete	Event	Time	Rank	Time	Rank	Time	Rank
Kyle Abeysinghe	50 metre freestyle	23.45	48	Did not advance			
Kyle Abeysinghe	100 metre freestyle	50.99	41	Did not advance			
Akalanka Peiris	50 metre backstroke	25.86	22	Did not advance			
Akalanka Peiris	100 metre backstroke	57.52	40	Did not advance			

Women

Athlete	Event	Heat		Semifinal		Final	
Athlete	Event	Time	Rank	Time	Rank	Time	Rank
Hiruki De Silva	100 metre freestyle	59.85	45	Did not advance			
Hiruki De Silva	200 metre freestyle	2:10.00	39	Did not advance			
Ganga Seneviratne	100 metre backstroke	1:04.93	38	Did not advance			
Ganga Seneviratne	200 metre backstroke	2:29.23	31	Did not advance			
