= Sri Lanka at the 2023 World Aquatics Championships =

- Flag of Sri Lanka
- FINA code: SRI
- National federation: Sri Lanka Aquatic Sports Union

in Fukuoka, Japan
- Competitors: 3 in 1 sport
- Medals: Gold 0 Silver 0 Bronze 0 Total 0

World Aquatics Championships appearances
- 1986; 1991; 1994; 1998; 2001; 2003; 2005; 2007; 2009; 2011; 2013; 2015; 2017; 2019; 2022; 2023; 2024

Other related appearances
- FINA athletes (2015)

Sri Lanka is set to compete at the 2023 World Aquatics Championships in Fukuoka, Japan from 14 to 30 July.

== Swimming ==
Sri Lanka entered 3 swimmers.

Men

| Athlete | Event | Heat | | Semifinal | | Final | |
| Athlete | Event | Time | Rank | Time | Rank | Time | Rank |
|---|---|---|---|---|---|---|---|
| Matthew Abeysinghe | 50 metre freestyle | 23.23 | 57 | Did not advance | | | |
| Matthew Abeysinghe | 100 metre freestyle | 50.46 | 51 | Did not advance | | | |

Women

| Athlete | Event | Heat | | Semifinal | | Final | |
| Athlete | Event | Time | Rank | Time | Rank | Time | Rank |
|---|---|---|---|---|---|---|---|
| Ramudi Samarakoon | 100 metre breaststroke | 1:15.36 | 52 | Did not advance | | | |
| Ramudi Samarakoon | 200 metre breaststroke | 2:45.61 | 34 | Did not advance | | | |
| Ganga Senavirathne | 100 metre backstroke | 1:04.86 | 48 | Did not advance | | | |
| Ganga Senavirathne | 200 metre backstroke | 2:23.36 | 37 | Did not advance | | | |
