= Sri Lanka at the 2017 World Aquatics Championships =

- Flag of Sri Lanka
- World Aquatics code: SRI
- National federation: Sri Lanka Aquatics Sports Union

in Budapest, Hungary
- Competitors: 4 in 1 sport
- Medals: Gold 0 Silver 0 Bronze 0 Total 0

World Aquatics Championships appearances
- 1986; 1991; 1994; 1998; 2001; 2003; 2005; 2007; 2009; 2011; 2013; 2015; 2017; 2019; 2022; 2023; 2024; 2025

Other related appearances
- FINA athletes (2015)

Sri Lanka competed at the 2017 World Aquatics Championships in Budapest, Hungary from 14 July to 30 July. The team consisted of four participants and went medalless during the competition.

== Swimming ==
Sri Lanka received Universality invitations from FINA to send four swimmers (two men and two women) to the World Championships. Matthew Abeysinghe was initially selected on the entry list of his respective events, but did not compete.

Athlete	Event	Heat		Semifinal		Final	
Athlete	Event	Time	Rank	Time	Rank	Time	Rank
Cherantha de Silva	Men's 50 m butterfly	25.15	49	did not advance			
Cherantha de Silva	Men's 100 m butterfly	55.09	55	did not advance			
Kimiko Raheem	Women's 100 m freestyle	58.35	44	did not advance			
Kimiko Raheem	Women's 100 m backstroke	1:04.06	40	did not advance			
Ishani Senanayake	Women's 200 m freestyle	2:13.38	46	did not advance			
Ishani Senanayake	Women's 400 m freestyle	4:45.48	35	—N/a		did not advance	
