= Belarus at the 2017 World Aquatics Championships =

- Flag of Belarus
- FINA code: BLR
- National federation: Swimming Federation of Belarus
- Website: www.belarusaquatics.com

in Budapest, Hungary
- Competitors: 28 in 4 sports
- Medals Ranked 25th: Gold 0 Silver 0 Bronze 2 Total 2

World Aquatics Championships appearances
- 1994; 1998; 2001; 2003; 2005; 2007; 2009; 2011; 2013; 2015; 2017; 2019; 2022–2023; 2024

Other related appearances
- Soviet Union (1973–1991)

Belarus is scheduled to compete at the 2017 World Aquatics Championships in Budapest, Hungary from 14 July to 30 July.

== Medalists ==
Medal	Name	Sport	Event	Date
Bronze	Aliaksandra Herasimenia	Swimming	Women's 50 m backstroke	July 27
Bronze	Yana Nestsiarava	High diving	Women's high diving	July 29

== Diving ==
Belarus has entered 5 divers (four male and one female).

Men

Athlete	Event	Preliminaries		Semifinals		Final	
Athlete	Event	Points	Rank	Points	Rank	Points	Rank
Mikita Tkachou	1 m springboard	206.40	51	—		did not advance	
Yauheni Karaliou	3 m springboard	328.05	39	did not advance			
Mikita Tkachou	3 m springboard	355.00	36	did not advance			
Vadim Kaptur	10 m platform	396.20	19	did not advance			
Yauheni Karaliou; Mikita Tkachou	3 m synchronized springboard	341.01	16	—		did not advance	
Artsiom Barouski; Vadim Kaptur	10 m synchronized platform	361.83	12 Q	—		362.04	12

Women

Athlete	Event	Preliminaries		Semifinals		Final	
Athlete	Event	Points	Rank	Points	Rank	Points	Rank
Alena Khamulkina	1 m springboard	242.80	16	—		did not advance	
Alena Khamulkina	3 m springboard	285.20	12 Q	273.35	17	did not advance	

Mixed

Athlete	Event	Final	
Athlete	Event	Points	Rank
Alena Khamulkina; Vadim Kaptur	Team	290.50	16

== High diving ==
Belarus qualified one male and one female high divers.

Athlete	Event	Points	Rank
Viktar Maslouski	Men's high diving	229.80	14
Yana Nestsiarava	Women's high diving	303.95	3rd place, bronze medalist(s)

== Swimming ==
Belarusian swimmers have achieved qualifying standards in the following events (up to a maximum of 2 swimmers in each event at the A-standard entry time, and 1 at the B-standard):

Men

Athlete	Event	Heat		Semifinal		Final	
Athlete	Event	Time	Rank	Time	Rank	Time	Rank
Yahor Dodaleu	50 m butterfly	23.66	16 Q	23.71	15	did not advance	
Artsiom Machekin	50 m freestyle	22.49	27	did not advance			
Pavel Sankovich	50 m backstroke	24.94	10 Q	24.74	6 Q	24.83	7
Pavel Sankovich	100 m butterfly	52.87	29	did not advance			
Ilya Shymanovich	50 m breaststroke	27.01	7 Q	26.90	7 Q	27.27	8
Ilya Shymanovich	100 m breaststroke	59.84	13 Q	1:00.01	16	did not advance	
Ilya Shymanovich	200 m breaststroke	2:13.46	24	did not advance			
Viktar Staselovich	50 m backstroke	25.55	=25	did not advance			
Mikita Tsmyh	100 m backstroke	54.69	19	did not advance			
Mikita Tsmyh	200 m backstroke	1:58.72	19	did not advance			
Yauhen Tsurkin	50 m freestyle	22.80	=41	did not advance			
Yauhen Tsurkin	100 m freestyle	49.82	42	did not advance			
Yauhen Tsurkin	50 m butterfly	23.55	15 Q	23.62	14	did not advance	
Viktar Krasochka; Anton Latkin; Artsiom Machekin; Viktar Staselovich	4×100 m freestyle relay	3:19.62	16	—		did not advance	
Artsiom Machekin; Ilya Shymanovich; Mikita Tsmyh; Yauhen Tsurkin	4×100 m medley relay	3:33.83	8 Q	—		3:33.63	8

Women

Athlete	Event	Heat		Semifinal		Final	
Athlete	Event	Time	Rank	Time	Rank	Time	Rank
Aliaksandra Herasimenia	50 m freestyle	24.82	11 Q	24.59	8 Q	24.46	5
Aliaksandra Herasimenia	50 m backstroke	27.65	=2 Q	27.54	7 Q	27.23 EU	3rd place, bronze medalist(s)
Yuliya Khitraya	50 m freestyle	25.10	18	did not advance			
Yuliya Khitraya	100 m freestyle	55.77	27	did not advance			

== Synchronized swimming ==
Belarus's synchronized swimming team consisted of 10 athletes (10 female).

Women

Athlete	Event	Preliminaries		Final	
Athlete	Event	Points	Rank	Points	Rank
Vasilina Khandoshka	Solo free routine	84.2000	10 Q	83.7667	10
Iryna Limanouskaya; Veronika Yesipovich	Duet technical routine	80.7824	16	did not advance	
Iryna Limanouskaya; Veronika Yesipovich	Duet free routine	82.5333	17	did not advance	
Aliaksandra Bichun; Vasilina Khandoshka (R); Iryna Limanouskaya; Anastasiya Navasiolava; Nastassia Shkuleva; Hanna Shulhina; Volha Taleiko (R); Anastasiya Tarakhovich; Valeryia Valasach; Veronika Yesipovich	Team technical routine	81.6227	12 Q	82.2796	12
Aliaksandra Bichun; Vasilina Khandoshka; Iryna Limanouskaya; Anastasiya Navasiolava; Nastassia Shkuleva (R); Hanna Shulhina; Volha Taleiko; Anastasiya Tarakhovich; Valeryia Valasach (R); Veronika Yesipovich	Team free routine	82.5333	13	did not advance	
Aliaksandra Bichun; Vasilina Khandoshka; Iryna Limanouskaya; Anastasiya Navasiolava; Nastassia Shkuleva; Hanna Shulhina; Volha Taleiko; Anastasiya Tarakhovich; Valeryia Valasach; Veronika Yesipovich	Free routine combination	82.3667	10 Q	83.4000	10

Legend: (R) = Reserve Athlete
