= Genevieve Bradley =

American high diver

Personal information
- Born: June 12, 1992 (age 32)

Sport
- Country: United States
- Sport: High diving

Genevieve Bradley (born June 12, 1992) is an American high diver. She represented the United States at the 2019 World Aquatics Championships in Gwangju, South Korea. She competed in the women's high diving event and she finished in 4th place.

In 2019, she also competed in the 2019 Red Bull Cliff Diving World Series.
