= Belarus at the 2015 World Aquatics Championships =

- Flag of Belarus
- FINA code: BLR
- National federation: Swimming Federation of Belarus
- Website: www.belarusaquatics.com

in Kazan, Russia
- Competitors: 24 in 4 sports
- Medals Ranked 28th: Gold 0 Silver 0 Bronze 1 Total 1

World Aquatics Championships appearances
- 1994; 1998; 2001; 2003; 2005; 2007; 2009; 2011; 2013; 2015; 2017; 2019; 2022–2023; 2024

Other related appearances
- Soviet Union (1973–1991)

Belarus competed at the 2015 World Aquatics Championships in Kazan, Russia from 24 July to 9 August 2015.

== Medalists ==
Medal	Name	Sport	Event	Date
Bronze	Yana Nestsiarava	High diving	Women's high diving	August 4

== Diving ==
Belarusian divers qualified for the individual spots at the World Championships.

Men

Athlete	Event	Preliminaries		Semifinals		Final	
Athlete	Event	Points	Rank	Points	Rank	Points	Rank
Yauheni Karaliou	1 m springboard	352.70	15	—		did not advance	
Yauheni Karaliou	3 m springboard	341.10	41	did not advance			
Vadim Kaptur	10 m platform	456.30	12 Q	440.30	12 Q	455.20	9
Vadim Kaptur; Yauheni Karaliou	10 m synchronized platform	373.92	13	—		did not advance	

Women

Athlete	Event	Preliminaries		Final	
Athlete	Event	Points	Rank	Points	Rank
Alena Khamulkina	1 m springboard	237.90	16	did not advance	

Mixed

Athlete	Event	Final	
Athlete	Event	Points	Rank
Vadim Kaptur; Alena Khamulkina	Team	352.00	10

== High diving ==
Belarus has qualified one high diver at the World Championships.

Athlete	Event	Points	Rank
Yana Nestsiarava	Women's high diving	233.10	Bronze medal

== Swimming ==
Belarusian swimmers have achieved qualifying standards in the following events (up to a maximum of 2 swimmers in each event at the A-standard entry time, and 1 at the B-standard):

Men

Athlete	Event	Heat		Semifinal		Final	
Athlete	Event	Time	Rank	Time	Rank	Time	Rank
Viktar Krasochka	200 m freestyle	1:54.36	64	did not advance			
Arseni Kukharau	100 m freestyle	50.21	44	did not advance			
Anton Latkin	50 m freestyle	22.67	=27	did not advance			
Pavel Sankovich	50 m backstroke	24.97	8 Q	25.02	10	did not advance	
Pavel Sankovich	100 m backstroke	55.79	35	did not advance			
Pavel Sankovich	100 m butterfly	52.29	16 Q	52.63	16	did not advance	
Ilya Shymanovich	200 m breaststroke	2:16.02	37	did not advance			
Viktar Staselovich	50 m backstroke	25.85	32	did not advance			
Yauhen Tsurkin	100 m freestyle	49.67	31	did not advance			
Yauhen Tsurkin	50 m butterfly	23.49	=9 Q	23.41	11	did not advance	
Yauhen Tsurkin	100 m butterfly	52.73	26	did not advance			
Arseni Kukharau; Anton Latkin; Yauhen Tsurkin; Artsiom Machekin	4 × 100 m freestyle relay	3:18.40	18	—		did not advance	
Artsiom Machekin; Pavel Sankovich; Ilya Shymanovich; Yauhen Tsurkin	4 × 100 m medley relay	3:38.23	15	—		did not advance	

Women

Athlete	Event	Heat		Semifinal		Final	
Athlete	Event	Time	Rank	Time	Rank	Time	Rank
Aliaksandra Herasimenia	50 m freestyle	25.20	18	did not advance			
Aliaksandra Herasimenia	100 m freestyle	54.90	=16 Q	54.68	15	did not advance	
Sviatlana Khakhlova	50 m backstroke	28.62	17	did not advance			
Alina Zmushka	50 m breaststroke	31.65	=26	did not advance			
Alina Zmushka	100 m breaststroke	1:11.39	43	did not advance			

== Synchronized swimming ==
Belarus fielded a full squad of ten synchronized swimmers to compete in each of the following events.

Athlete	Event	Preliminaries		Final	
Athlete	Event	Points	Rank	Points	Rank
Iryna Limanouskaya; Veronika Yesipovich	Duet technical routine	79.1333	19	did not advance	
Iryna Limanouskaya; Veronika Yesipovich	Duet free routine	79.9000	18	did not advance	
Iryna Limanouskaya; Anastasiya Navasiolava; Hanna Shulhina; Volha Taleiko; Anastasiya Tarakhovich; Dominika Tsyplakova; Valeriya Valasach*; Elmira Wardak*; Veronika Yesipovich; Iya Zhyshkevich	Team technical routine	80.2507	14	did not advance	
Iryna Limanouskaya; Anastasiya Navasiolava*; Hanna Shulhina; Volha Taleiko; Anastasiya Tarakhovich; Dominika Tsyplakova; Valeriya Valasach; Elmira Wardak*; Veronika Yesipovich; Iya Zhyshkevich	Team free routine	81.6000	13	did not advance	
Iryna Limanouskaya; Anastasiya Navasiolava; Hanna Shulhina; Volha Taleiko; Anastasiya Tarakhovich; Dominika Tsyplakova; Valeriya Valasach; Elmira Wardak; Veronika Yesipovich; Iya Zhyshkevich	Free routine combination	81.8333	11 Q	82.3000	12
