= Belarus at the 2019 World Aquatics Championships =

- Flag of Belarus
- FINA code: BLR
- National federation: Swimming Federation of Belarus
- Website: www.belarusaquatics.com

World Aquatics Championships appearances
- 1994; 1998; 2001; 2003; 2005; 2007; 2009; 2011; 2013; 2015; 2017; 2019; 2022–2023; 2024

Other related appearances
- Soviet Union (1973–1991)

Belarus competed at the 2019 World Aquatics Championships in Gwangju, South Korea from 12 to 28 July.

== Artistic swimming ==
Belarus' artistic swimming team consisted of 11 athletes (11 female).

Women

Athlete	Event	Preliminaries		Final	
Athlete	Event	Points	Rank	Points	Rank
Vasilina Khandoshka	Solo technical routine	84.4333	9 Q	84.4867	9
Vasilina Khandoshka	Solo free routine	84.7000	10 Q	85.0667	10
Vasilina Khandoshka; Valeryia Valasach	Duet technical routine	81.8044	16	did not advance	
Vasilina Khandoshka; Valeryia Valasach	Duet free routine	83.1000	=15	did not advance	
Vera Butsel; Marharyta Kiryliuk; Hanna Koutsun; Yana Kudzina; Kseniya Kuliashova; Anastasiya Navasiolava; Anastasiya Suvalava; Aliaksandra Vysotskaya; Kseniya Tratseuskaya (R); Valeryia Valasach (R)	Team technical routine	81.5990	14	did not advance	
Vera Butsel; Marharyta Kiryliuk; Hanna Koutsun; Yana Kudzina; Kseniya Kuliashova; Anastasiya Navasiolava; Kseniya Tratseuskaya; Aliaksandra Vysotskaya; Anastasiya Suvalava (R); Valeryia Valasach (R)	Team free routine	82.5667	13	did not advance	
Vera Butsel; Marharyta Kiryliuk; Hanna Koutsun; Yana Kudzina; Kseniya Kuliashova; Anastasiya Navasiolava; Anastasiya Suvalava; Kseniya Tratseuskaya; Valeryia Valasach; Aliaksandra Vysotskaya; Vasilina Khandoshka (R)	Free routine combination	82.8333	8 Q	82.9667	9

Legend: (R) = Reserve Athlete

== Diving ==
Belarus entered two divers.

Men

Athlete	Event	Preliminaries		Semifinals		Final	
Athlete	Event	Points	Rank	Points	Rank	Points	Rank
Yury Naurozau	3 m springboard	348.65	35	did not advance			

Women

Athlete	Event	Preliminaries		Semifinals		Final	
Athlete	Event	Points	Rank	Points	Rank	Points	Rank
Alena Khamulkina	1 m springboard	206.50	29	—		did not advance	
Alena Khamulkina	3 m springboard	246.95	27	did not advance			

== High diving ==
Belarus qualified one female high diver.

Athlete	Event	Points	Rank
Yana Nestsiarava	Women's high diving	DNS	

== Swimming ==
Belarus entered seven swimmers.

Men

Athlete	Event	Heat		Semifinal		Final	
Athlete	Event	Time	Rank	Time	Rank	Time	Rank
Artsiom Machekin	50 m freestyle	22.41	=26	did not advance			
Artsiom Machekin	100 m freestyle	49.90	41	did not advance			
Ilya Shymanovich	50 m breaststroke	26.87	=4 Q	26.77	4 Q	26.85	5
Ilya Shymanovich	100 m breaststroke	58.87	2 Q	59.38	12	did not advance	
Ilya Shymanovich	200 m breaststroke	2:12.19	27	did not advance			
Mikita Tsmyh	50 m backstroke	25.11	=12 Q	25.12	15	did not advance	
Mikita Tsmyh	100 m backstroke	53.81 NR	11 Q	54.24	16	did not advance	
Mikita Tsmyh	200 m backstroke	2:01.44	30	did not advance			
Yauhen Tsurkin	50 m butterfly	23.70	19	did not advance			
Yauhen Tsurkin	100 m butterfly	52.44	=14 Q	52.55	16	did not advance	
Mikita Tsmyh; Ilya Shymanovich; Yauhen Tsurkin; Artsiom Machekin	4 × 100 m medley relay	3:34.56	9	—		did not advance	

Women

Athlete	Event	Heat		Semifinal		Final	
Athlete	Event	Time	Rank	Time	Rank	Time	Rank
Aksana Dziamidava	100 m freestyle	56.33	38	did not advance			
Aksana Dziamidava	100 m butterfly	1:00.51	31	did not advance			
Alina Zmushka	50 m breaststroke	30.71	7 Q	31.11	9	did not advance	
Alina Zmushka	100 m breaststroke	1:07.69	15 Q	1:07.69	15	did not advance	
Alina Zmushka	200 m breaststroke	2:35.58	28	did not advance			

Mixed

Athlete	Event	Heat		Final	
Athlete	Event	Time	Rank	Time	Rank
Mikita Tsmyh; Ilya Shymanovich; Anastasiya Shkurdai; Aksana Dziamidava	4 × 100 m medley relay	3:45.88	9	did not advance	
