= Sri Lanka at the 2022 World Aquatics Championships =

- Flag of Sri Lanka
- FINA code: SRI
- National federation: Sri Lanka Aquatics Sports Union

in Budapest, Hungary
- Competitors: 6 in 2 sports
- Medals: Gold 0 Silver 0 Bronze 0 Total 0

World Aquatics Championships appearances
- 1986; 1991; 1994; 1998; 2001; 2003; 2005; 2007; 2009; 2011; 2013; 2015; 2017; 2019; 2022; 2023; 2024

Other related appearances
- FINA athletes (2015)

Sri Lanka competed at the 2022 World Aquatics Championships in Budapest, Hungary from 17 June to 3 July. Five of the six entered swimmers could not compete due to their visa's being rejected. Aniqah Gaffoor was able to compete as she was a FINA Scholarship holder.

== Open water swimming ==
Sri Lanka entered one male and one female open water swimmers.

Men

Athlete	Event	Time	Rank
Dilanka Bandisaththamge	Men's 5 km	DNS	

Women

Athlete	Event	Time	Rank
Seneshi Herath	Women's 5 km	DNS	

== Swimming ==
Sri Lanka entered four swimmers.

Men

Athlete	Event	Heat		Semifinal		Final	
Athlete	Event	Time	Rank	Time	Rank	Time	Rank
Akalanka Peiris	50 m backstroke	Withdrawn		Did not advance			
Akalanka Peiris	100 m backstroke	Withdrawn		Did not advance			
Dhinal Weerasinghe	50 m freestyle	Withdrawn		Did not advance			
Dhinal Weerasinghe	100 m freestyle	Withdrawn		Did not advance			

Women

Athlete	Event	Heat		Semifinal		Final	
Athlete	Event	Time	Rank	Time	Rank	Time	Rank
Aniqah Gaffoor	50 m butterfly	29.79	48	Did not advance			
Aniqah Gaffoor	100 m butterfly	1:07.79	27	Did not advance			
Ganga Senavirathne	100 m backstroke	Withdrawn		Did not advance			
Ganga Senavirathne	200 m backstroke	Withdrawn		Did not advance			
