= Sri Lanka at the 2013 World Aquatics Championships =

- Flag of Sri Lanka
- FINA code: SRI
- National federation: Sri Lanka Aquatics Sports Union
- Website: www.aquatics.lk

in Barcelona, Spain
- Competitors: 4 in 1 sports
- Medals: Gold 0 Silver 0 Bronze 0 Total 0

World Aquatics Championships appearances
- 1986; 1991; 1994; 1998; 2001; 2003; 2005; 2007; 2009; 2011; 2013; 2015; 2017; 2019; 2022; 2023; 2024

Other related appearances
- FINA athletes (2015)

Sri Lanka competed at the 2013 World Aquatics Championships in Barcelona, Spain between 19 July and 4 August 2013.

== Swimming ==
Sri Lankan swimmers earned qualifying standards in the following events (up to a maximum of 2 swimmers in each event at the A-standard entry time, and 1 at the B-standard):

Men

Athlete	Event	Heat		Semifinal		Final	
Athlete	Event	Time	Rank	Time	Rank	Time	Rank
Don Kalu Achchige	100 m freestyle	56.53	74	did not advance			
Don Kalu Achchige	50 m butterfly	26.70	62	did not advance			
Heshan Unamboowe	50 m backstroke	27.23	35	did not advance			
Heshan Unamboowe	100 m backstroke	58.49	38	did not advance			

Women

Athlete	Event	Heat		Semifinal		Final	
Athlete	Event	Time	Rank	Time	Rank	Time	Rank
Nadeera Jayasekera	50 m backstroke	32.33	46	did not advance			
Nadeera Jayasekera	100 m backstroke	1:09.70	=44	did not advance			
Kimiko Raheem	50 m freestyle	27.87	51	did not advance			
Kimiko Raheem	200 m backstroke	2:26.61	34	did not advance			
