= Sri Lanka at the 2011 World Aquatics Championships =

- Flag of Sri Lanka
- FINA code: SRI
- National federation: Sri Lanka Aquatics Sports Union
- Website: www.aquatics.lk

in Shanghai, China
- Competitors: 3
- Medals: Gold 0 Silver 0 Bronze 0 Total 0

World Aquatics Championships appearances
- 1986; 1991; 1994; 1998; 2001; 2003; 2005; 2007; 2009; 2011; 2013; 2015; 2017; 2019; 2022; 2023; 2024

Other related appearances
- FINA athletes (2015)

Sri Lanka competed at the 2011 World Aquatics Championships in Shanghai, China. Sri Lanka sent 3 athletes to these championships.

== Swimming ==
For the first time ever qualification standards were put in place, which meant smaller countries such as Sri Lanka could only send wild cards (2 male and 1 female). The three swimmers were selected after selection trials at the Police Pool in Colombo in April 2011.

Men

Athlete	Event	Heats		Semifinals		Final	
Athlete	Event	Time	Rank	Time	Rank	Time	Rank
Heshan Unamboowe	50 m freestyle	24.64	57	did not advance			
Heshan Unamboowe	100 m backstroke	57.95	43	did not advance			
Matthew Abeysinghe	200 m freestyle	1:55.33	48	did not advance			
Matthew Abeysinghe	400 m freestyle	4:09.45	42			did not advance	

Women

Athlete	Event	Heats		Semifinals		Final	
Athlete	Event	Time	Rank	Time	Rank	Time	Rank
Reshika Udugampola	100 m freestyle	1:04.23	63	did not advance			
Reshika Udugampola	50 m butterfly	31.15	42	did not advance			
