= High diving at the 2017 World Aquatics Championships =

2017 High diving in Budapest

High diving at the 2017 World Aquatics Championships was held between 28 and 30 July 2017 in Budapest, Hungary.

== Schedule ==
Two events will be held.

All time are local (UTC+2).

Date	Time	Event
28 July 2017	12:30	Women Round 1
28 July 2017	14:00	Men Rounds 1–2
29 July 2017	12:15	Women Rounds 2–4
30 July 2017	12:00	Men Rounds 3–4

== Medal summary ==
=== Medal table ===
Rank	Nation	Gold	Silver	Bronze	Total
1	Australia	1	0	0	1
1	United States	1	0	0	1
3	Czech Republic	0	1	0	1
3	Mexico	0	1	0	1
5	Belarus	0	0	1	1
5	Italy	0	0	1	1
Totals (6 entries)		2	2	2	6

=== Medal events ===
Event	Gold		Silver		Bronze	
Men	Steve LoBue; United States	397.15	Michal Navrátil; Czech Republic	390.90	Alessandro De Rose; Italy	379.65
Women	Rhiannan Iffland; Australia	320.70	Adriana Jiménez; Mexico	308.90	Yana Nestsiarava; Belarus	303.95
