= Sri Lanka at the 2019 World Aquatics Championships =

- Flag of Sri Lanka
- FINA code: SRI
- National federation: Sri Lanka Aquatics Sports Union

in Gwangju, South Korea
- Competitors: 3 in 1 sport
- Medals: Gold 0 Silver 0 Bronze 0 Total 0

World Aquatics Championships appearances
- 1986; 1991; 1994; 1998; 2001; 2003; 2005; 2007; 2009; 2011; 2013; 2015; 2017; 2019; 2022; 2023; 2024

Other related appearances
- FINA athletes (2015)

Sri Lanka competed at the 2019 World Aquatics Championships in Gwangju, South Korea from 12 to 28 July.

== Swimming ==
Sri Lanka qualified four swimmers. One swimmer did not participated.

Men

Athlete	Event	Heat		Semifinal		Final	
Athlete	Event	Time	Rank	Time	Rank	Time	Rank
Dimuth Peiris	50 m backstroke	27.18	55	did not advance			
Dimuth Peiris	100 m backstroke	59.62	54	did not advance			

Women

Athlete	Event	Heat		Semifinal		Final	
Athlete	Event	Time	Rank	Time	Rank	Time	Rank
Aniqah Gaffoor	50 m butterfly	30.36	49	did not advance			
Aniqah Gaffoor	100 m butterfly	1:12.63	49	did not advance			
Kimiko Raheem	50 m freestyle	27.56	57	did not advance			
Kimiko Raheem	100 m backstroke	1:06.52	50	did not advance			
