= Helena Merten =

Australian high diver (born 1995)

Personal information
- Born: March 17, 1995 (age 31)

Sport
- Country: Australia
- Sport: High diving

Helena Merten (born 17 March 1995) is an Australian high diver and acrobatic performer. She placed second at the 2017 Red Bull Cliff Diving World Series and won a silver medal in women's 20m at the FINA High Diving World Cup 2016.

== Early life and education ==
Merten is originally from the Gold Coast, Australia. From the age of 5, Merten trained in various acrobatic sports including gymnastics, tumbling, diving, and circus. She attended A.B. Paterson College.

== Career ==
At age 17, Merten moved abroad to join the cast of The House of Dancing Water, a water-based acrobatic show in Macau. She performed with the show for two years and began cliff diving in 2015.

When Merten joined the 2016 Red Bull Cliff Diving World Series as a season regular, she became the youngest diver to compete in the series' permanent line up at age 21. After the first five dives of the seven-dive season, she was ranked fourth overall. After placing second in the final stop of the season, Merten placed fourth in the series. She placed second in women's 20m at the FINA High Diving World Cup 2016, with 229.60 points, behind Lysanne Richard's 253.80 points.

Merten placed second overall in the 2017 Red Bull Cliff Diving World Series, behind fellow Australian Rhiannan Iffland, and had four podium finishes that season. She placed seventh in women's high diving at the 2017 World Aquatics Championships and eight at the 2017 FINA High Diving World Cup. Since 2017, Merten has been playing the Running Woman in the touring production of Cirque du Soleil's Luzia. The role involves hoop diving and a Chinese pole.
