= Great Britain at the 2019 World Aquatics Championships =

- Flag of Great Britain
- World Aquatics code: GBR
- National federation: British Swimming
- Website: britishswimming.org

in Gwangju, South Korea
- Medals Ranked 7th: Gold 4 Silver 2 Bronze 6 Total 12

World Aquatics Championships appearances
- 1973; 1975; 1978; 1982; 1986; 1991; 1994; 1998; 2001; 2003; 2005; 2007; 2009; 2011; 2013; 2015; 2017; 2019; 2022; 2023; 2024; 2025

Great Britain competed at the 2019 World Aquatics Championships in Gwangju, South Korea from 12 to 28 July.

== Medalists ==
Medal	Name	Sport	Event	Date
Gold	Gary Hunt	High diving	Men's high diving	24 July
Gold	Adam Peaty	Swimming	Men's 100 metre breaststroke	22 July
Gold	Adam Peaty	Swimming	Men's 50 metre breaststroke	24 July
Gold	Luke Greenbank; Adam Peaty; James Guy; Duncan Scott; James Wilby*	Swimming	Men's 4 x 100 metre medley relay	28 July
Silver	Daniel Goodfellow; Jack Laugher	Diving	Men's synchronized 3 m springboard	13 July
Silver	James Wilby	Swimming	Men's 100 metre breaststroke	22 July
Bronze	Tom Daley; Matty Lee	Diving	Men's synchronized 10 m platform	15 July
Bronze	Jack Laugher	Diving	Men's 3 m springboard	18 July
Bronze	Jessica Macaulay	High diving	Women's high diving	23 July
Bronze	Duncan Scott	Swimming	Men's 200 metre freestyle	23 July
Bronze	Georgia Davies; Adam Peaty; James Guy; Freya Anderson; James Wilby*	Swimming	4 x 100 metre mixed medley relay	24 July
Bronze	Luke Greenbank	Swimming	Men's 200 metre backstroke	26 July

== Artistic swimming ==
Great Britain's artistic swimming team consisted of 2 athletes (2 female).

Women

Athlete	Event	Preliminaries		Final	
Athlete	Event	Points	Rank	Points	Rank
Kate Shortman	Solo technical routine	83.4981	10 Q	83.9548	10
Kate Shortman	Solo free routine	84.6000	11 Q	84.7667	11
Kate Shortman; Isabelle Thorpe	Duet technical routine	83.5904	14	Did not advance	
Kate Shortman; Isabelle Thorpe	Duet free routine	83.8000	14	Did not advance	

== Diving ==
Great Britain entered 13 divers.

Men

Athlete	Event	Preliminaries		Semifinals		Final	
Athlete	Event	Points	Rank	Points	Rank	Points	Rank
Ross Haslam	1 m springboard	322.90	23	—N/a		Did not advance	
James Heatly	1 m springboard	355.35	10 Q	—N/a		372.15	9
James Heatly	3 m springboard	315.40	46	Did not advance			
Jack Laugher	3 m springboard	485.50	2 Q	468.45	3 Q	504.55	3rd place, bronze medalist(s)
Tom Daley	10 m platform	514.60	2 Q	505.40	3 Q	470.35	7
Noah Williams	10 m platform	406.45	11 Q	480.50	6 Q	440.95	10
Daniel Goodfellow; Jack Laugher	3 m synchronized springboard	377.22	4 Q	—N/a		415.02	2nd place, silver medalist(s)
Tom Daley; Matty Lee	10 m synchronized platform	416.28	2 Q	—N/a		425.91	3rd place, bronze medalist(s)

Women

Athlete	Event	Preliminaries		Semifinals		Final	
Athlete	Event	Points	Rank	Points	Rank	Points	Rank
Katherine Torrance	1 m springboard	236.75	10 Q	—N/a		255.40	4
Scarlett Mew Jensen	1 m springboard	217.10	19	—N/a		Did not advance	
Scarlett Mew Jensen	3 m springboard	247.90	26	Did not advance			
Grace Reid	3 m springboard	277.95	13 Q	300.75	8 Q	286.95	8
Robyn Birch	10 m platform	288.50	15 Q	297.00	15	Did not advance	
Lois Toulson	10 m platform	311.90	9 Q	319.60	7 Q	303.60	12
Grace Reid; Katherine Torrance	3 m synchronized springboard	280.53	4 Q	—N/a		289.80	5
Eden Cheng; Lois Toulson	10 m synchronized platform	281.10	7 Q	—N/a		289.14	6

Mixed

Athlete	Event	Final	
Athlete	Event	Points	Rank
Tom Daley; Grace Reid	3 m synchronized springboard	298.47	4
Noah Williams; Robyn Birch	10 m synchronized platform	285.18	4
Ross Haslam; Eden Cheng	Team	327.90	6

== High diving ==
Great Britain qualified three male and one female high divers.

Men

Athlete	Event	Points	Rank
Blake Aldridge	Men's high diving	216.25	20
Gary Hunt	Men's high diving	442.20	1st place, gold medalist(s)
Owen Weymouth	Men's high diving	232.40	16

Women

Athlete	Event	Points	Rank
Jessica Macaulay	Women's high diving	295.40	3rd place, bronze medalist(s)

== Open water swimming ==
Great Britain qualified three male and three female open water swimmers.

Men

Athlete	Event	Time	Rank
Jack Burnell	Men's 10 km	1:48:09.9	12
Gordon Mason	Men's 5 km	54:01.0	42
Tobias Robinson	Men's 10 km	1:48:23.5	18

Women

Athlete	Event	Time	Rank
Alice Dearing	Women's 10 km	1:55:05.9	17
Danielle Huskisson	Women's 10 km	1:55:31.5	25
Maisie Macartney	Women's 5 km	1:01:50.5	43

Mixed

Athlete	Event	Time	Rank
Jack Burnell; Alice Dearing; Danielle Huskisson; Tobias Robinson	Team	55:31.1	11

== Swimming ==
Great Britain entered 25 swimmers.

Men

Athlete	Event	Heat		Semifinal		Final	
Athlete	Event	Time	Rank	Time	Rank	Time	Rank
Thomas Dean	200 m individual medley	1:59.64	15 Q	1:58.34	11	Did not advance	
Luke Greenbank	100 m backstroke	53.95	15 Q	53.75	14	Did not advance	
Luke Greenbank	200 m backstroke	1:56.83	3 Q	1:56.60	3 Q	1:55.85	3rd place, bronze medalist(s)
James Guy	200 m freestyle	1:46.18	1 Q	1:45.95	11	Did not advance	
James Guy	100 m butterfly	52.06	11 Q	51.69	7 Q	51.62	7
Daniel Jervis	400 m freestyle	3:50.90	17	—N/a		Did not advance	
Daniel Jervis	1500 m freestyle	15:01.50	13	—N/a		Did not advance	
Max Litchfield	400 m individual medley	4:14.35	4 Q	—N/a		4:14.75	7
Ross Murdoch	200 m breaststroke	2:09.05	=5 Q	2:08.51	11	Did not advance	
Adam Peaty	50 m breaststroke	26.28	1 Q	26.11	1 Q	26.06	1st place, gold medalist(s)
Adam Peaty	100 m breaststroke	57.59	1 Q	56.88 WR	1 Q	57.14	1st place, gold medalist(s)
Benjamin Proud	50 m freestyle	21.69	2 Q	21.56	3 Q	21.55	5
Benjamin Proud	50 m butterfly	23.35	9 Q	23.14	7 Q	23.01	7
Nicholas Pyle	50 m backstroke	25.58	=26	Did not advance			
Duncan Scott	100 m freestyle	DNS		Did not advance			
Duncan Scott	200 m freestyle	1:46.45	5 Q	1:45.56	=4 Q	1:45.63	3rd place, bronze medalist(s)
Duncan Scott	200 m individual medley	1:58.57	5 Q	1:57.83	6 Q	1:56.91	5
James Wilby	100 m breaststroke	59.15	5 Q	58.83	3 Q	58.46	2nd place, silver medalist(s)
James Wilby	200 m breaststroke	2:09.90	13 Q	2:08.52	12	Did not advance	
Duncan Scott; James Guy; Ben Proud; Scott McLay	4×100 m freestyle relay	3:12.42	2 Q	—N/a		3:11.81	5
Duncan Scott; Calum Jarvis; Thomas Dean; James Guy; Max Litchfield*; Cameron Kurle*	4×200 m freestyle relay	7:08.45	=7 Q	—N/a		7:02.04	5
Luke Greenbank; Adam Peaty; James Guy; Duncan Scott; James Wilby*	4×100 m medley relay	3:32.35	4 Q	—N/a		3:28.10 ER	1st place, gold medalist(s)

Women

Athlete	Event	Heat		Semifinal		Final	
Athlete	Event	Time	Rank	Time	Rank	Time	Rank
Freya Anderson	100 m freestyle	53.77	11 Q	53.31	=7 Q	53.44	8
Freya Anderson	200 m freestyle	1:57.68	9 Q	1:57.51	12	Did not advance	
Georgia Davies	50 m backstroke	27.92	4 Q	27.72	3 Q	27.65	=4
Georgia Davies	100 m backstroke	59.84	7 Q	59.90	12	Did not advance	
Jessica Fullalove	100 m backstroke	1:01.40	27	Did not advance			
Jessica Fullalove	200 m backstroke	2:11.08	16 Q	2:11.12	15	Did not advance	
Holly Hibbott	200 m freestyle	1:59.60	18	Did not advance			
Holly Hibbott	400 m freestyle	4:07.92	10	—N/a		Did not advance	
Anna Hopkin	50 m freestyle	24.85	11 Q	24.34	6 Q	24.40	7
Anna Hopkin	100 m freestyle	53.21	3 Q	53.65	13	Did not advance	
Siobhan-Marie O'Connor	200 m individual medley	2:10.99	7 Q	2:10.49	8 Q	2:10.43	7
Molly Renshaw	100 m breaststroke	1:07.43	13 Q	1:06.73	6 Q	1:06.96	7
Molly Renshaw	200 m breaststroke	2:25.17	=8 Q	2:23.16	4 Q	2:23.78	5
Laura Stephens	200 m butterfly	2:09.03	8 Q	2:09.06	8 Q	2:09.35	8
Alys Thomas	100 m butterfly	59.25	24	Did not advance			
Alys Thomas	200 m butterfly	2:08.69	6 Q	2:08.26	6 Q	2:07.48	5
Aimee Willmott	200 m individual medley	2:13.90	18	Did not advance			
Aimee Willmott	400 m individual medley	4:41.24	11	—N/a		Did not advance	
Georgia Davies; Molly Renshaw; Alys Thomas; Freya Anderson; Anna Hopkin*	4×100 m medley relay	3:59.74	7 Q	—N/a		3:59.38	8

Mixed

Athlete	Event	Heat		Final	
Athlete	Event	Time	Rank	Time	Rank
Georgia Davies; Adam Peaty; James Guy; Freya Anderson; James Wilby*	4×100 m medley relay	3:43.37	4 Q	3:40.68	3rd place, bronze medalist(s)

Legend: (*) = Swimmers who participated in the heat only.
