= Belarus at the 2013 World Aquatics Championships =

- Flag of Belarus
- World Aquatics code: BLR
- National federation: Swimming Federation of Belarus
- Website: www.belarusaquatics.com

in Barcelona, Spain
- Competitors: 22 in 3 sports
- Medals: Gold 0 Silver 0 Bronze 0 Total 0

World Aquatics Championships appearances
- 1994; 1998; 2001; 2003; 2005; 2007; 2009; 2011; 2013; 2015; 2017; 2019; 2022–2025

Other related appearances
- Soviet Union (1973–1991)

Belarus competed at the 2013 World Aquatics Championships, held in Barcelona, Spain between 19 July and 4 August 2013.

== Diving ==
Belarus qualified two quota places for the following diving events.

=== Men ===
Athlete	Event	Preliminaries		Semifinals		Final	
Athlete	Event	Points	Rank	Points	Rank	Points	Rank
Yauheni Karaliou	1 m springboard	247.70	39	—N/a		did not advance	
Yauheni Karaliou	3 m springboard	335.80	36	did not advance			
Vadim Kaptur	10 m platform	425.90	8 Q	430.65	12 Q	447.30	9
Vadim Kaptur; Yauheni Karaliou	10 m synchronized platform	343.02	11 Q	—N/a		356.79	11

== Swimming ==
Belarusian swimmers earned qualifying standards in the following events (up to a maximum of 2 swimmers in each event at the A-standard entry time, and 1 at the B-standard):

=== Men ===
Athlete	Event	Heat		Semifinal		Final	
Athlete	Event	Time	Rank	Time	Rank	Time	Rank
Ihar Boki	200 m freestyle	1:52.60	47	did not advance			
Ihar Boki	400 m freestyle	3:58.27	35	—N/a		did not advance	
Pavel Kapylou	200 m breaststroke	2:16.68	34	did not advance			
Yury Klemparski	50 m breaststroke	27.61	19	did not advance			
Pavel Sankovich	50 m backstroke	25.40	14 Q	25.36	15	did not advance	
Pavel Sankovich	100 m backstroke	55.13	22	did not advance			
Pavel Sankovich	100 m butterfly	52.87	21	did not advance			
Yury Suvorau	200 m butterfly	2:01.28	26	did not advance			
Yury Suvorau	200 m individual medley	2:02.60	31	did not advance			
Yury Suvorau	400 m individual medley	4:21.82	19	—N/a		did not advance	
Yauhen Tsurkin	100 m freestyle	49.41 NR	17	did not advance			
Yauhen Tsurkin	50 m butterfly	23.45	=12 Q	22.90 NR	3 Q	23.28	=6
Yauhen Tsurkin	100 m butterfly	52.03 NR	6 Q	51.78 NR	8 Q	51.65 NR	=7
Viktar Vabishchevich	100 m breaststroke	1:02.08	39	did not advance			
Uladzimir Zhyharau	800 m freestyle	8:05.51	24	—N/a		did not advance	
Uladzimir Zhyharau	1500 m freestyle	15:30.65	29	—N/a		did not advance	
Ihar Boki; Pavel Sankovich; Yauhen Tsurkin; Viktar Vabishchevich	4 × 100 m medley relay	3:40.75	17	—N/a		did not advance	

=== Women ===
Athlete	Event	Heat		Semifinal		Final	
Athlete	Event	Time	Rank	Time	Rank	Time	Rank
Aksana Dziamidava	100 m freestyle	57.30	40	did not advance			
Yuliya Khitraya	50 m freestyle	25.56	21	did not advance			

== Synchronized swimming ==
Belarus has qualified ten synchronized swimmers.

Athlete	Event	Preliminaries		Final	
Athlete	Event	Points	Rank	Points	Rank
Iryna Limanouskaya	Solo technical routine	76.800	21	did not advance	
Iryna Limanouskaya; Iya Zhyshkevich	Duet free routine	76.940	20	did not advance	
Iryna Limanouskaya; Iya Zhyshkevich	Duet technical routine	77.300	19	did not advance	
Hanna Besprozvannikh; Anastasiya Frolova; Darya Krautsevich; Iryna Limanouskaya; Hanna Shulhina; Volha Taleiko; Anastasiya Tarakhovich; Dominika Tsyplakova; Veronika Yesipovich; Iya Zhyshkevich	Free routine combination	79.580	13	did not advance	
