= High diving at the 2013 World Aquatics Championships – Women =

Women at the High diving at the 2013 World Aquatics Championships
- Dates: 30 July
- Competitors: 6 from 4 nations
- Winning points: 211.60

Medalists
gold medal	Cesilie Carlton	United States
silver medal	Ginger Huber	United States
bronze medal	Anna Bader	Germany

The women's competition of the High diving events at the 2013 World Aquatics Championships was held on 30 July 2013. The competition was divided into three rounds with jumps of 20m.

== Results ==
The final was started at 16:00.

Rank	Diver	Nationality	Round 1	Round 2	Round 3	Total
1st place, gold medalist(s)	Cesilie Carlton	United States	54.60	72.85	84.15	211.60
2nd place, silver medalist(s)	Ginger Huber	United States	62.40	79.05	65.25	206.70
3rd place, bronze medalist(s)	Anna Bader	Germany	65.00	72.60	66.30	203.90
4	Stephanie de Lima	Canada	50.70	71.40	60.45	182.55
5	Tara Hyer Tira	United States	62.40	57.40	57.40	177.20
6	Diana Tomilina	Ukraine	42.90	74.25	36.80	153.95
