= Vanuatu at the 2019 World Aquatics Championships =

- Flag of Vanuatu
- FINA code: VAN

in Gwangju, South Korea
- Competitors: 1 in 1 sport
- Medals: Gold 0 Silver 0 Bronze 0 Total 0

World Aquatics Championships appearances
- 2019; 2022; 2023; 2024

Vanuatu competed at the 2019 World Aquatics Championships in Gwangju, South Korea from 12 to 28 July 2019.

== Swimming ==
Vanuatu entered one swimmer.

Men

Athlete	Event	Heat		Semifinal		Final	
Athlete	Event	Time	Rank	Time	Rank	Time	Rank
Hollingsword Wolul	50 m backstroke	38.67	72	did not advance			
Hollingsword Wolul	50 m breaststroke	41.44	78	did not advance			
