= Swimming at the 2019 World Aquatics Championships – Men's 50 metre breaststroke =

Men's 50 metre breaststroke at the 2019 World Aquatics Championships
- Venue: Nambu University Municipal Aquatics Center
- Location: Gwangju, South Korea
- Dates: 23 July (heats and semifinals); 24 July (final)
- Competitors: 79 from 75 nations
- Winning time: 26.06

Medalists
gold medal	Adam Peaty	Great Britain
silver medal	Felipe Lima	Brazil
bronze medal	João Gomes Júnior	Brazil

The Men's 50 metre breaststroke competition at the 2019 World Championships was held on 23 and 24 July 2019.

== Records ==
Prior to the competition, the existing world and championship records were as follows.

World record	Adam Peaty (GBR)	25.95	Budapest, Hungary	25 July 2017
Competition record	Adam Peaty (GBR)	25.95	Budapest, Hungary	25 July 2017

== Results ==
=== Heats ===
The heats were held on 23 July at 10:00.

Rank	Heat	Lane	Name	Nationality	Time	Notes
1	8	4	Adam Peaty	Great Britain	26.28	Q
2	6	4	João Gomes Júnior	Brazil	26.73	Q
2	7	4	Felipe Lima	Brazil	26.73	Q
4	7	6	Hüseyin Emre Sakçı	Turkey	26.87	Q, NR
4	8	5	Ilya Shymanovich	Belarus	26.87	Q
6	7	2	Kirill Prigoda	Russia	26.93	Q
6	8	6	Yan Zibei	China	26.93	Q, AS
8	8	8	Darragh Greene	Ireland	26.94	Q, NR
9	6	2	Andrei Nikolaev	Russia	26.99	Q
10	8	3	Nicolo Martinenghi	Italy	27.00	Q
11	6	5	Michael Andrew	United States	27.02	Q
12	7	5	Fabio Scozzoli	Italy	27.11	Q
13	6	7	Tobias Bjerg	Denmark	27.13	Q, NR
14	6	6	Ties Elzerman	Netherlands	27.19	Q
15	8	9	Nikola Obrovac	Croatia	27.27	Q, NR
16	6	3	Yasuhiro Koseki	Japan	27.33	Q
17	8	0	Dmitriy Balandin	Kazakhstan	27.36	R
18	8	1	Wang Lizhuo	China	27.39	R
19	7	3	Michael Houlie	South Africa	27.41	
20	5	4	Anton Sveinn McKee	Iceland	27.46	NR
21	7	1	Bernhard Reitshammer	Austria	27.49	
22	8	2	Peter John Stevens	Slovenia	27.50	
23	6	0	Moon Jae-kwon	South Korea	27.57	
24	5	3	Youssef El-Kamash	Egypt	27.62	NR
25	6	1	Itay Goldfaden	Israel	27.67	
25	7	7	Giedrius Titenis	Lithuania	27.67	
27	7	0	Édgar Crespo	Panama	27.76	
28	5	7	Richard Funk	Canada	27.78	
29	4	7	Martin Allikvee	Estonia	27.79	NR
30	6	8	Renato Prono	Paraguay	27.80	
31	6	9	Martin Melconian	Uruguay	27.85	
32	7	8	Vladislav Mustafin	Uzbekistan	27.90	
33	4	8	James Deiparine	Philippines	27.91	NR
34	4	6	Yannick Käser	Switzerland	27.99	
35	5	5	Lachezar Shumkov	Bulgaria	28.00	
36	5	2	Chao Man Hou	Macau	28.07	
37	5	1	Kirill Vais	Kyrgyzstan	28.15	
38	5	6	Tomáš Klobučník	Slovakia	28.20	
39	4	2	Jan Kalusowski	Poland	28.26	
40	7	9	Jorge Murillo	Colombia	28.36	
41	4	3	Wu Chun-feng	Chinese Taipei	28.43	
42	5	8	S.P. Likhith	India	28.44	
43	5	9	Ari-Pekka Liukkonen	Finland	28.45	
44	5	0	Lionel Khoo	Singapore	28.46	
45	3	4	Josué Domínguez	Dominican Republic	28.50	
46	1	4	Benjamin Schulte	Guam	28.73	NR
47	4	4	Didzis Rudavs	Latvia	28.94	
48	4	1	Gagarin Nathaniel	Indonesia	28.97	
49	4	5	Izaak Bastian	Bahamas	28.98	
50	4	0	Marco Flores	Honduras	29.09	
51	3	5	Adrian Robinson	Botswana	29.11	
52	3	6	Rainier Rafaela	Curaçao	29.23	
53	2	3	Santiago Cavanagh	Bolivia	29.26	
54	4	9	Sebastien Kouma	Mali	29.27	
55	3	3	Malcolm Richardson	Cook Islands	29.36	
56	1	6	Amini Fonua	Tonga	29.73	
57	1	0	Constantin Malachi	Moldova	29.76	
58	2	7	Rashed Altarmoom	Kuwait	30.13	
58	3	2	Giacomo Casadei	San Marino	30.13	
60	1	1	Muhammad Isa Ahmad	Brunei	30.22	
61	2	9	Jonathan Raharvel	Madagascar	30.23	
61	3	7	Zandanbal Gunsennorov	Mongolia	30.23	
63	3	1	Shane Cadogan	Saint Vincent and the Grenadines	30.73	
64	2	2	Slava Sihanouvong	Laos	32.11	
65	3	0	Tendo Mukalazi	Uganda	32.64	
66	1	5	Tindwende Sawadogo	Burkina Faso	33.97	
67	3	9	Clayment Lafiara	Solomon Islands	34.37	
68	2	1	Izzeldin Ibrahim	Sudan	34.52	
69	1	7	Momodou Saine	Gambia	34.64	
70	2	4	Yaya Yeressa	Guinea	34.71	
71	2	5	Gildas Koumondji	Benin	34.90	
72	2	6	Abdelmalik Muktar	Ethiopia	35.17	
73	2	0	Chris Mana	Rwanda	36.93	
74	2	8	Hamid Rahimi	Afghanistan	37.48	
75	1	2	Alie Kamara	Sierra Leone	37.79	
76	1	8	Hakim Youssouf	Comoros	38.65	
77	1	9	Darshan Koffi	Togo	40.39	
78	1	3	Hollingsword Wolul	Vanuatu	41.44	
	3	8	Kumaren Naidu	Zambia	DSQ	
	8	7	Andrew Wilson	United States	DNS	

=== Semifinals ===
The semifinals were held on 23 July at 20:41.

==== Semifinal 1 ====
Rank	Lane	Name	Nationality	Time	Notes
1	7	Fabio Scozzoli	Italy	26.70	Q, NR
2	4	João Gomes Júnior	Brazil	26.84	Q
3	3	Kirill Prigoda	Russia	27.08	QSO
4	6	Darragh Greene	Ireland	27.14	
5	5	Hüseyin Emre Sakçı	Turkey	27.17	
6	8	Yasuhiro Koseki	Japan	27.22	
7	2	Nicolo Martinenghi	Italy	27.31	
8	1	Ties Elzerman	Netherlands	27.61	

==== Semifinal 2 ====
Rank	Lane	Name	Nationality	Time	Notes
1	4	Adam Peaty	Great Britain	26.11	Q
2	5	Felipe Lima	Brazil	26.62	Q
3	3	Ilya Shymanovich	Belarus	26.77	Q
4	6	Yan Zibei	China	26.86	Q, AS
5	7	Michael Andrew	United States	26.88	Q
6	1	Tobias Bjerg	Denmark	27.08	QSO, NR
7	2	Andrei Nikolaev	Russia	27.17	
8	8	Nikola Obrovac	Croatia	27.31	

=== Swim-off ===
The swim-off was held on 23 July at 22:02.

Rank	Lane	Name	Nationality	Time	Notes
1	4	Kirill Prigoda	Russia	27.09	Q
2	5	Tobias Bjerg	Denmark	27.16	

=== Final ===
The final was held on 24 July at 21:03.

Rank	Lane	Name	Nationality	Time	Notes
1st place, gold medalist(s)	4	Adam Peaty	Great Britain	26.06	
2nd place, silver medalist(s)	5	Felipe Lima	Brazil	26.66	
3rd place, bronze medalist(s)	2	João Gomes Júnior	Brazil	26.69	
4	8	Kirill Prigoda	Russia	26.72	NR
5	6	Ilya Shymanovich	Belarus	26.85	
6	7	Yan Zibei	China	26.86	=AS
7	1	Michael Andrew	United States	26.93	
	3	Fabio Scozzoli	Italy	DSQ	
