= High diving at the 2019 World Aquatics Championships =

2019 World Aquatics Championships - High Diving - Year: 2019

- Host city: Gwangju, South Korea
- Date: 22–24 July
- Venue: Chosun University University Football Field
- Events: 2

High diving at the 2019 World Aquatics Championships was held between 22 and 24 July 2019.

== Schedule ==
Two events were held.

All time are local (UTC+9).

Date	Time	Event
22 July 2019	11:30	Women Rounds 1–2
22 July 2019	14:00	Men Rounds 1–2
23 July 2019	12:00	Women Rounds 3–4
24 July 2019	12:00	Men Rounds 3–4

== Medal summary ==
=== Medal table ===
Rank	Nation	Gold	Silver	Bronze	Total
1	Great Britain	1	0	1	2
2	Australia	1	0	0	1
3	Mexico	0	1	1	2
4	United States	0	1	0	1
Totals (4 entries)		2	2	2	6

=== Medal events ===
Event	Gold		Silver		Bronze	
Men	Gary Hunt; Great Britain	442.20	Steven LoBue; United States	433.65	Jonathan Paredes; Mexico	430.15
Women	Rhiannan Iffland; Australia	298.05	Adriana Jiménez; Mexico	297.90	Jessica Macaulay; Great Britain	295.40
