= Vanuatu at the 2024 World Aquatics Championships =

- Flag of Vanuatu
- FINA code: VAN
- National federation: Vanuatu Aquatics Federation
- Website: vanuatuaquatics.com

in Doha, Qatar
- Competitors: 2 in 1 sport
- Medals: Gold 0 Silver 0 Bronze 0 Total 0

World Aquatics Championships appearances
- 2019; 2022; 2023; 2024

Vanuatu competed at the 2024 World Aquatics Championships in Doha, Qatar from 2 to 18 February.

== Swimming ==
Vanuatu entered 2 swimmers.

Men

Athlete	Event	Heat		Semifinal		Final	
Athlete	Event	Time	Rank	Time	Rank	Time	Rank
Johnathan Silas	50 metre freestyle	27.74	106	Did not advance			
Johnathan Silas	100 metre freestyle	1:01.86	99	Did not advance			

Women

Athlete	Event	Heat		Semifinal		Final	
Athlete	Event	Time	Rank	Time	Rank	Time	Rank
Loane Russet	50 metre freestyle	29.33	79	Did not advance			
Loane Russet	100 metre freestyle	1:05.97	73	Did not advance			
