= Cesilie Carlton =

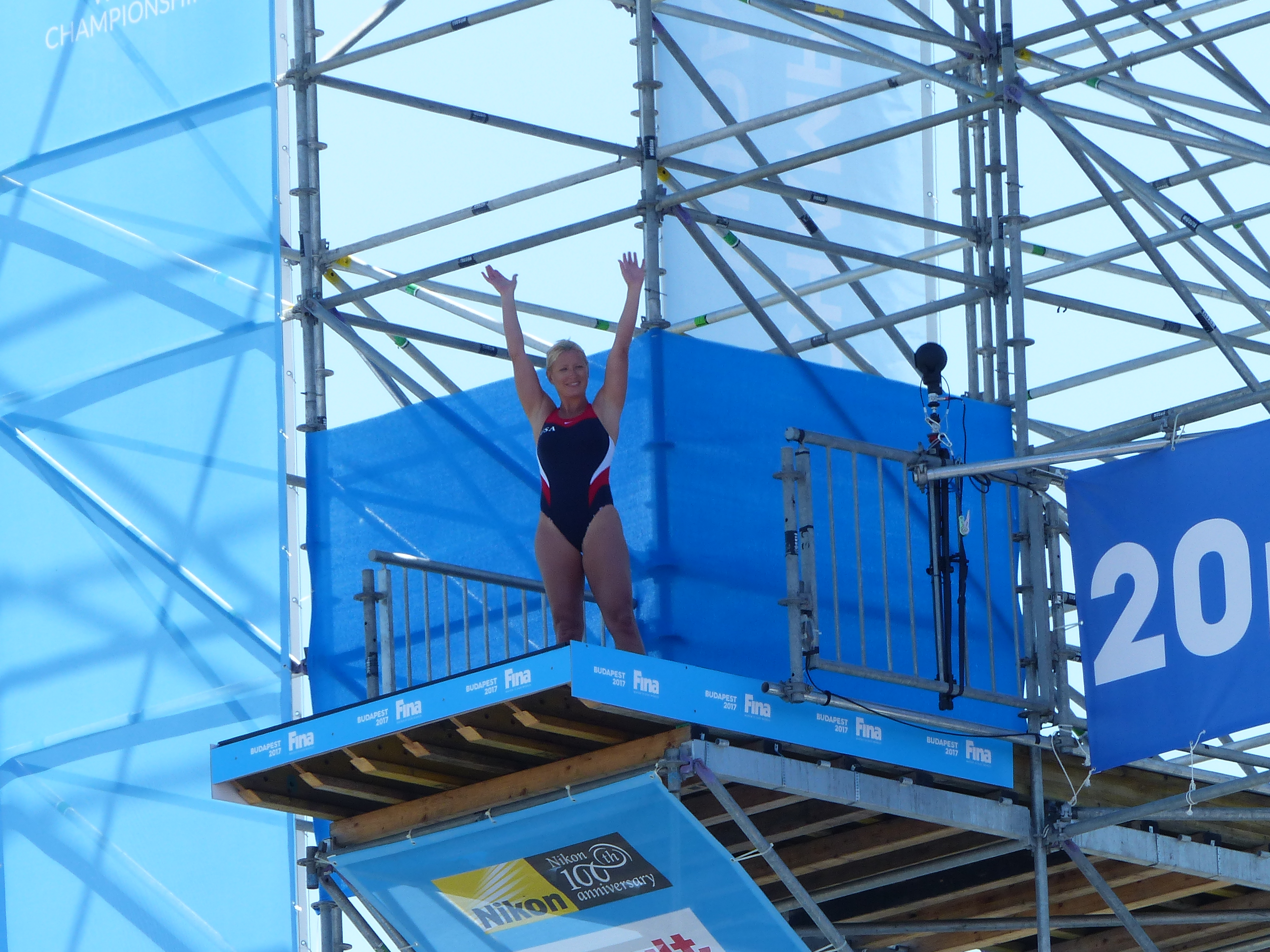
- Carlton at 2017 World Championships

Personal information
- Born: March 27, 1981 (age 45) San Antonio, Texas, United States

Sport
- Sport: Diving
Medal record
Representing United States
World Championships
Gold medal – first place	2013 Barcelona	Women
Silver medal – second place	2015 Kazan	Women

Cesilie Carlton (born 27 March 1981) is an American high diver who won the first gold medal at the high diving competition at the 2013 World Aquatics Championships. She defeated her fellow countrywoman Ginger Huber and German Anna Bader to win the gold medal. In 2015, she won the silver medal.

Awards
Preceded by First award	FINA High Diver of the Year; 2013	Succeeded by (United States) Rachelle Simpson
