= 2019 World Aquatics Championships =

18th edition of the World Aquatics Championships

18th FINA World Championships
- Host city: Gwangju, South Korea
- Date: 12–28 July 2019
- Venues: Nambu University; Chosun University; Yeosu Expo Ocean Park; Yeomju Gymnasium
- Nations: 192
- Athletes: 2,623
- Opened by: Moon Jae-in
- Closed by: Julio Maglione
- Website: gwangju2019.com

The 2019 World Aquatics Championships were the 18th FINA World Aquatics Championships, held in Gwangju, South Korea from 12 to 28 July 2019. The city had previously hosted the 2015 Summer Universiade aquatics events in the same venues.

== Host selection ==
The host was announced on 19 July 2013 on the biennial General Congress of FINA in Barcelona, the host-city of the 2013 World Aquatics Championships. Budapest was awarded the 2021 Championships in the same vote, though in 2015 it was announced that they will host the 2017 Championships due to Guadalajara's withdrawal. Fukuoka was subsequently awarded the 2021 event.

The awarding was controversial within Korea as the South Korean government claimed that the mayor of Gwangju had forged the signature of endorsement. As a result, the Korean government initially refused to fund the event, but eventually agreed upon passage of a law that required National Assembly approval for future bids for major sporting events.

== Symbols ==
The mascots for the event were a pair of otters, chosen due to their natural habitat being in the mountains near Gwangju, as well as their symbolizing "swimmers' passion for challenge", according to the organizing committee. The slogan of the Championships, meanwhile, was "Dive Into Peace".

== Venues ==
Most of the competitions were held at the Main Aquatics Centre, built for the 2015 Summer Universiade, also hosted in Gwangju. The Aquatics Centre hosted the swimming and diving competitions, and there were two adjacent outdoor temporary venues for synchronised swimming and water polo.

- Nambu University Municipal Aquatics Center (swimming, diving)
- Nambu University Stadium (water polo)
- Yeomju Gymnasium (artistic swimming)
- Chosun University Football Field (high diving)
- Yeosu Expo Ocean Park (open water swimming)

== Schedule ==
A total of 76 medal events were held across six disciplines. Beach water polo was introduced as a demonstration, non-medal event.

●	Opening ceremony	●	Other competitions	●	Finals	●	Closing ceremony	M	Men's matches	W	Women's matches

July	12	13	14	15	16	17	18	19	20	21	22	23	24	25	26	27	28	Total
Ceremonies	●																●	-
Swimming										4	4	5	5	5	5	6	8	42
Open water swimming		1	1		1	1	1	2										7
Artistic swimming	●	1	1	2	1	1	1	1	2									10
Diving	●	3	2	2	1	1	1	1	2									13
High diving											●	1	1					2
Water polo			W	M	W	M	W	M	W	M	W	M	W	M	W	M		2
Beach water polo		●	W	M	W	M	W	M										2
Total	0	5	4	4	3	3	3	4	4	4	4	6	6	5	6	7	8	76
Cumulative Total	0	5	9	13	16	19	22	26	30	34	38	44	50	55	61	68	76	76

== Medal table ==
China topped the medal table, although the United States won the highest number of medals in total. Host nation South Korea earned one bronze medal, from Kim Su-ji in the Women's 1 m springboard.

* Host nation (South Korea)

Rank	Nation	Gold	Silver	Bronze	Total
1	China	16	11	3	30
2	United States	15	11	10	36
3	Russia	12	11	7	30
4	Australia	7	9	7	23
5	Hungary	5	0	0	5
6	Italy	4	6	5	15
7	Great Britain	4	2	6	12
8	Germany	3	2	3	8
9	Brazil	2	3	2	7
10	Canada	2	2	7	11
11	Japan	2	2	6	10
12	France	1	3	3	7
13	Sweden	1	2	2	5
14	Ukraine	1	1	5	7
15	South Africa	1	1	2	4
16	Spain	0	4	1	5
17	Mexico	0	2	4	6
18	Greece	0	1	0	1
18	Malaysia	0	1	0	1
18	Netherlands	0	1	0	1
18	Norway	0	1	0	1
18	Switzerland	0	1	0	1
23	Croatia	0	0	1	1
23	Egypt	0	0	1	1
23	New Zealand	0	0	1	1
23	South Korea*	0	0	1	1
Totals (26 entries)		76	77	77	230

== Participating nations ==
Out of 209 FINA members, 191 nations took part in the Championships, as well as a Refugee Team of independent FINA athletes. 194 teams initially entered, setting a new record number of participating nations. However, Lesotho and the United Arab Emirates subsequently withdrew their athletes and did not appear on the start list.

- FINA members not participating were Anguilla, Belize, British Virgin Islands, Chad, Republic of the Congo, Democratic Republic of the Congo, Dominica, Guinea-Bissau, Gibraltar, Iraq, Lesotho, Liberia, Mauritania, Myanmar, North Korea, Somalia, Turks and Caicos Islands and United Arab Emirates.
- At the time of the Championships, the Nations of Kiribati, Nauru, South Sudan, São Tomé e Príncipe and Tuvalu were not FINA members.
- Afghanistan (2)
- Albania (4)
- Algeria (3)
- American Samoa (2)
- Andorra (3)
- Angola (4)
- Antigua and Barbuda (4)
- Argentina (6)
- Armenia (6)
- Aruba (6)
- Australia (88)
- Austria (11)
- Azerbaijan (1)
- Bahamas (4)
- Bahrain (3)
- Bangladesh (4)
- Barbados (4)
- Belarus (21)
- Belgium (10)
- Benin (3)
- Bermuda (3)
- Bhutan (2)
- Bolivia (7)
- Bosnia and Herzegovina (4)
- Botswana (3)
- Brazil (61)
- Brunei (3)
- Bulgaria (7)
- Burundi (3)
- Burkina Faso (4)
- Cambodia (3)
- Cameroon (1)
- Canada (66)
- Cape Verde (3)
- Cayman Islands (4)
- Central African Republic (1)
- Chile (8)
- China (94)
- Chinese Taipei (14)
- Colombia (21)
- Comoros (2)
- Cook Islands (3)
- Costa Rica (15)
- Croatia (25)
- Cuba (26)
- Curaçao (3)
- Cyprus (4)
- Czech Republic (16)
- Denmark (12)
- Djibouti (3)
- Dominican Republic (6)
- Timor-Leste (3)
- Ecuador (8)
- Egypt (26)
- El Salvador (4)
- Equatorial Guinea (3)
- Eritrea (2)
- Estonia (10)
- Eswatini (3)
- Ethiopia (4)
- Faroe Islands (3)
- Federated States of Micronesia (4)
- Fiji (4)
- Independent FINA Athletes (2)
- Finland (10)
- France (36)
- Gabon (2)
- The Gambia (3)
- Georgia (6)
- Germany (57)
- Ghana (4)
- Great Britain (47)
- Greece (49)
- Grenada (3)
- Guam (3)
- Guatemala (6)
- Guinea (3)
- Guyana (3)
- Haiti (3)
- Honduras (4)
- Hong Kong (29)
- Hungary (69)
- India (12)
- Indonesia (8)
- Iran (2)
- Ireland (13)
- Iceland (4)
- Israel (25)
- Italy (85)
- Ivory Coast (3)
- Jamaica (4)
- Japan (72)
- Jordan (4)
- Kazakhstan (51)
- Kenya (4)
- Kosovo (3)
- Kuwait (8)
- Kyrgyzstan (4)
- Laos (3)
- Latvia (6)
- Lebanon (4)
- Libya (2)
- Liechtenstein (4)
- Lithuania (10)
- Luxembourg (6)
- Macau (12)
- Madagascar (4)
- Malaysia (14)
- Malawi (4)
- Mali (3)
- Malta (3)
- Marshall Islands (3)
- Maldives (4)
- Mauritius (4)
- Mexico (40)
- Moldova (4)
- Monaco (3)
- Mongolia (4)
- Montenegro (16)
- Morocco (4)
- Mozambique (3)
- Namibia (3)
- Netherlands (37)
- Nepal (4)
- New Zealand (51)
- Nicaragua (3)
- Niger (3)
- Nigeria (4)
- North Macedonia (5)
- Northern Mariana Islands (4)
- Norway (6)
- Oman (1)
- Pakistan (3)
- Palau (4)
- Palestine (2)
- Panama (4)
- Papua New Guinea (4)
- Paraguay (4)
- Peru (5)
- Philippines (4)
- Poland (36)
- Portugal (13)
- Puerto Rico (6)
- Qatar (3)
- Romania (9)
- Russia (91)
- Rwanda (2)
- San Marino (4)
- Saint Kitts and Nevis (1)
- Saint Lucia (4)
- (Saint Vincent and the Grenadines) Saint Vincent & the Grenadines (3)
- Samoa (2)
- Saudi Arabia (1)
- Senegal (5)
- Serbia (22)
- Seychelles (8)
- Sierra Leone (3)
- Singapore (30)
- Sint Maarten (1)
- Slovenia (5)
- Slovakia (18)
- Solomon Islands (2)
- South Africa (64)
- South Korea (78) (Host)
- Spain (58)
- Sri Lanka (3)
- Sudan (4)
- Suriname (4)
- Switzerland (30)
- Sweden (13)
- Syria (2)
- Tajikistan (4)
- Tanzania (4)
- Thailand (28)
- Togo (3)
- Tonga (4)
- Trinidad and Tobago (3)
- Tunisia (1)
- Turkey (19)
- Turkmenistan (3)
- Uganda (4)
- Ukraine (32)
- United States (115)
- Uruguay (5)
- Uzbekistan (11)
- Vanuatu (1)
- Venezuela (10)
- Vietnam (7)
- Virgin Islands (3)
- Yemen (3)
- Zambia (3)
- Zimbabwe (4)

== Media coverage ==
In the United States, NBCUniversal holds rights to the event.
