= Ginger Huber =

American diver

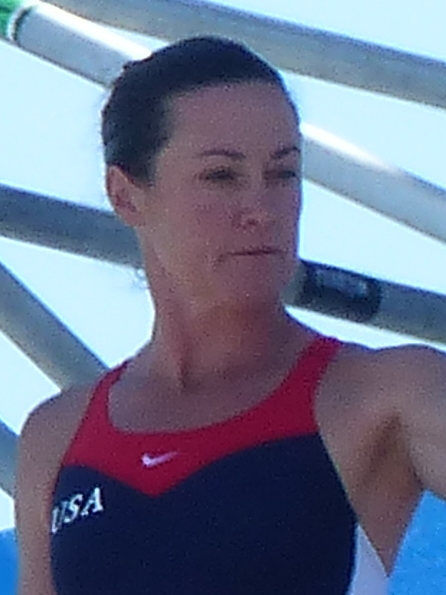
- Ginger Huber at 2017 World Aquatics Championships

Personal information
- Full name: Ginger Huber
- Born: December 6, 1974 (age 51) San Diego, California, United States
Medal record
World Championships
Silver medal – second place	2013 Barcelona	High diving

Ginger Huber (born December 6, 1974) is an American diver who won the silver medal at the 2013 World Aquatics Championships in Barcelona at the High diving event behind Cesilie Carlton and before Anna Bader.
