= Anna Bader =

German high diver

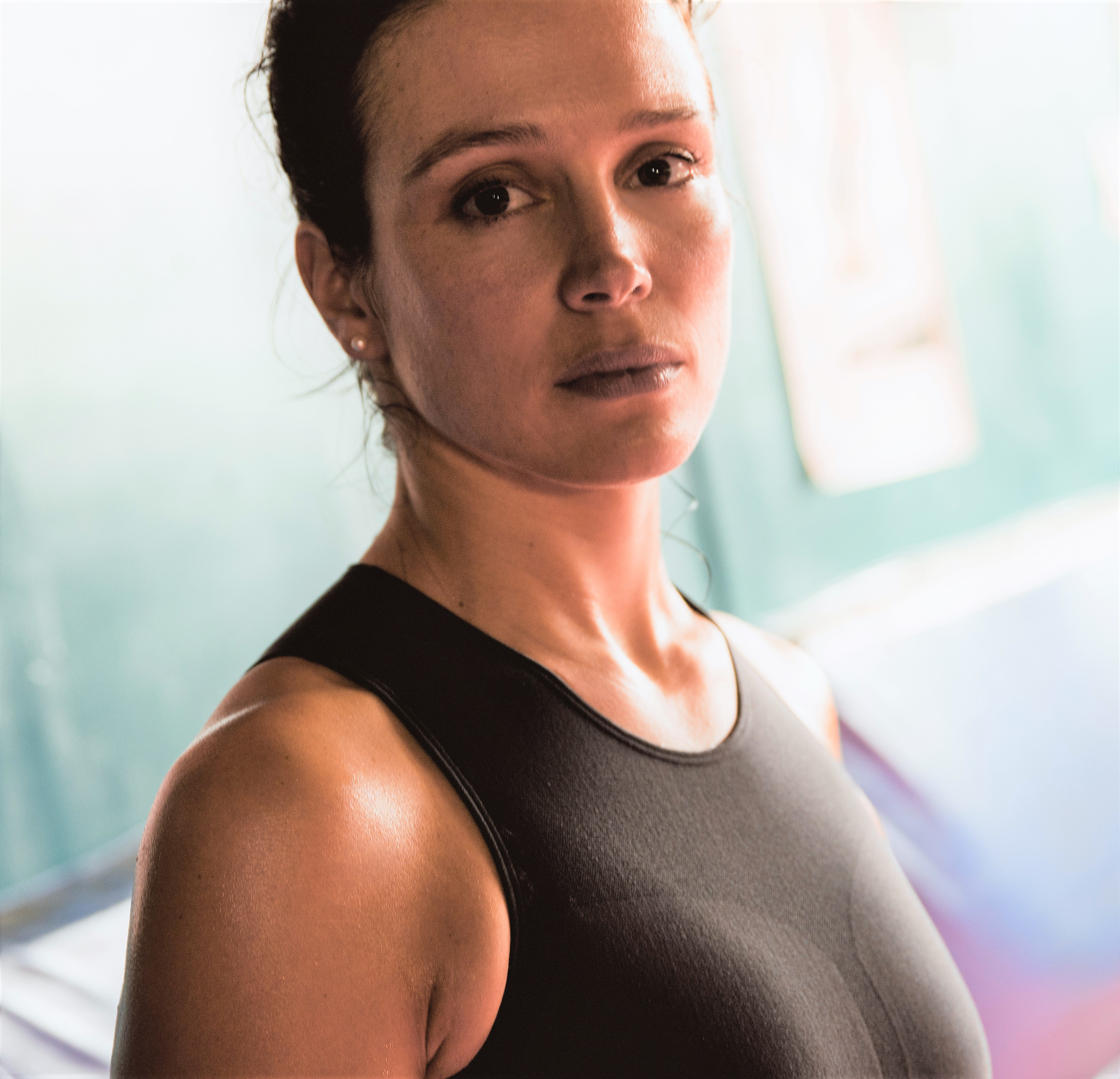
- Bader in 2018

Personal information
- Full name: Anna Bader
- Nationality: German
- Born: Mutlangen, West Germany
Medal record
World Championships
Bronze medal – third place	2013 Barcelona	High diving

Anna Bader (born 12 December 1983) is a German high diver. She competed in the 2013 World Aquatics Championships in Barcelona, Spain the Red Bull Cliff Diving World Series in 2013, 2014 and 2015, and the 2015 World Aquatics Championships in Kazan, Russia.

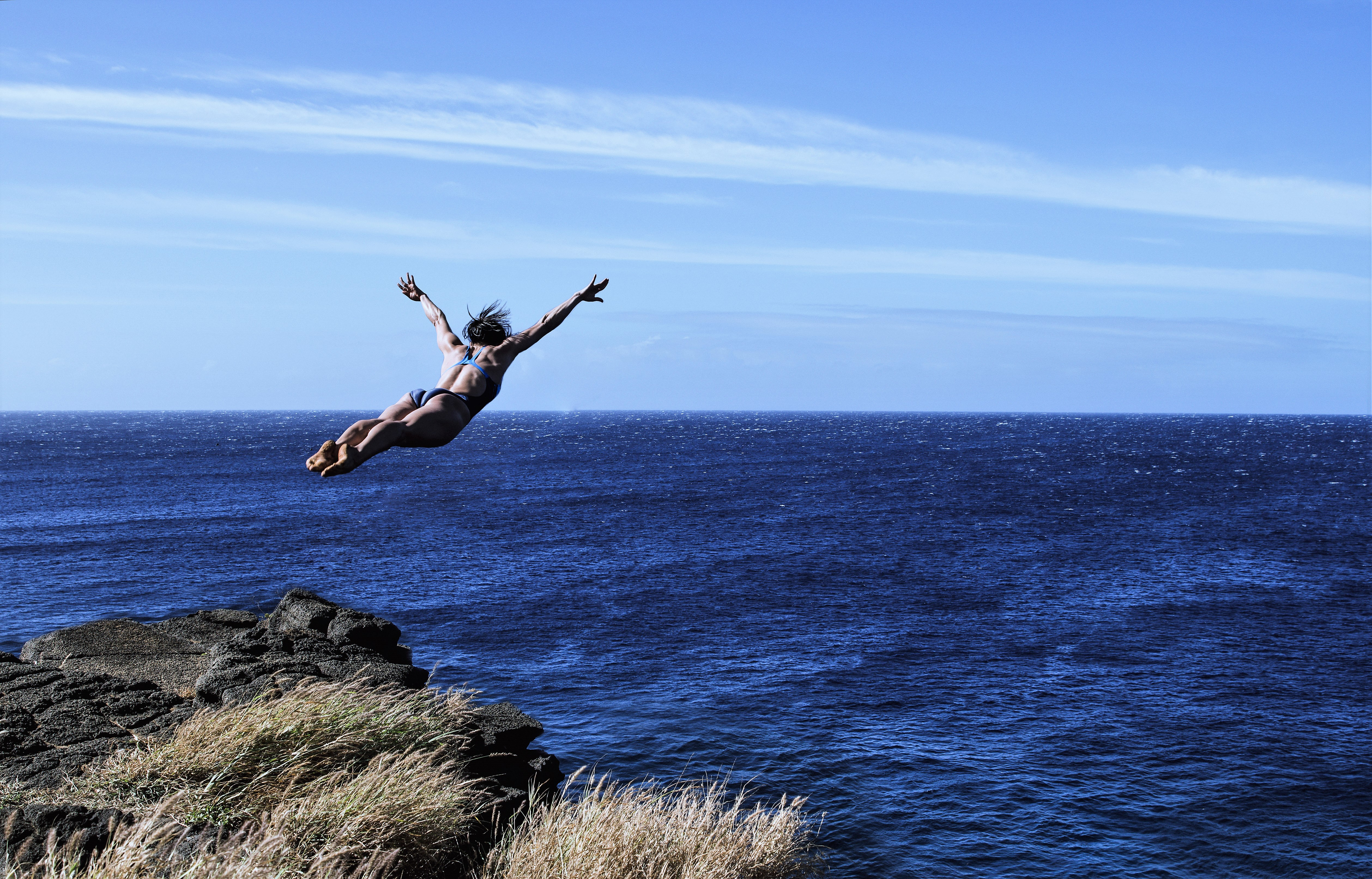
Bader cliff diving in 2018

== 2013 World Aquatic Championships ==
The 2013 World Aquatics Championships were held in Barcelona, Spain. She won the bronze medal at the 2013 World Aquatics Championships in Barcelona, Spain at the High diving event behind Cesilie Carlton and Ginger Huber. She scored 203.90 for an overall score.

=== Round 1 ===
For round 1 she did a back armstand 1 1/2 somersault and scored 65.00 points.

=== Round 2 ===
For round 2 she did a front 3 somersault with 1 1/2 twist and scored 72.60 points.

=== Round 3 ===
For round 3 she did a back 2 somersault with 2 twists and scored 66.30 points.

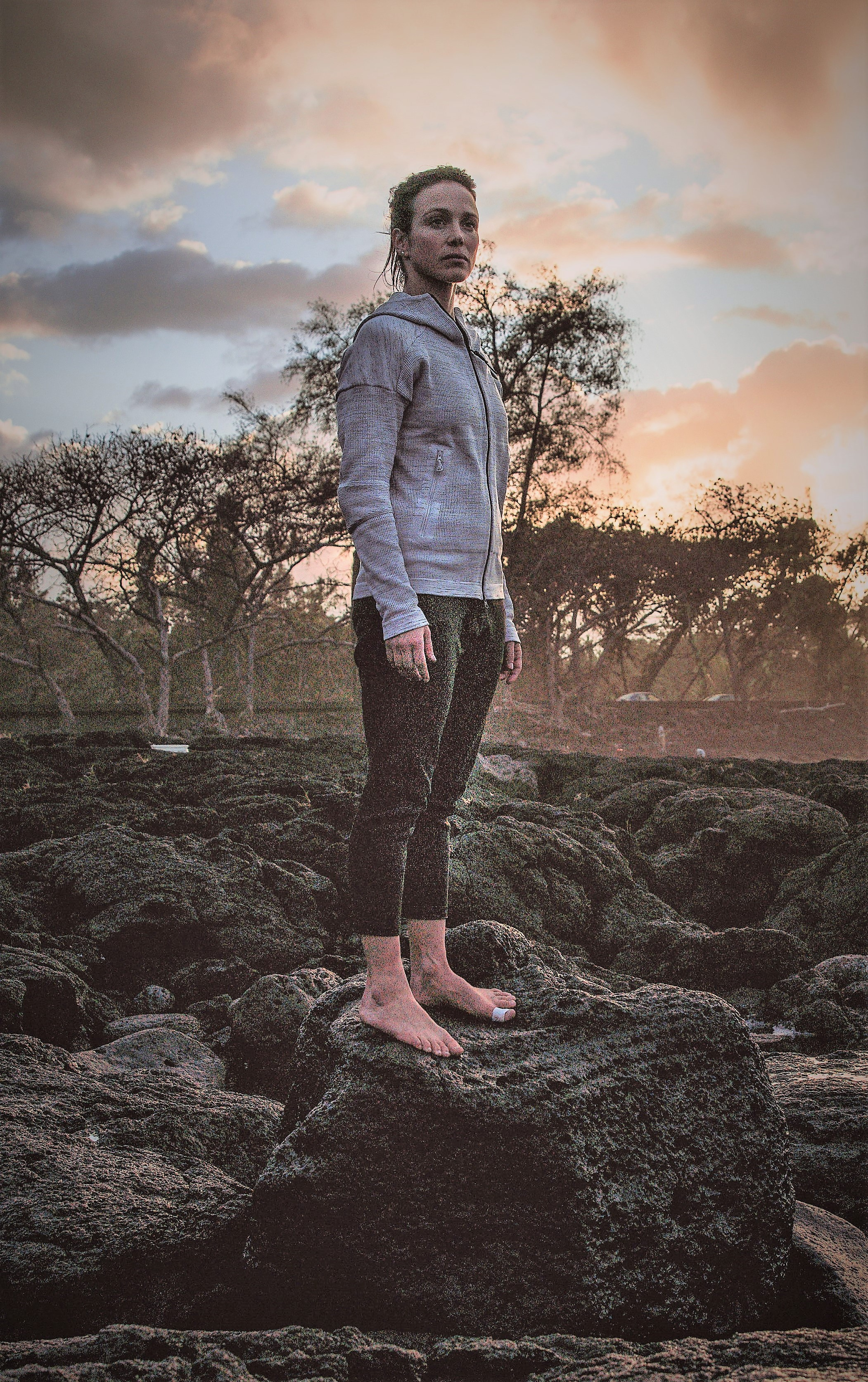
Bader in 2018

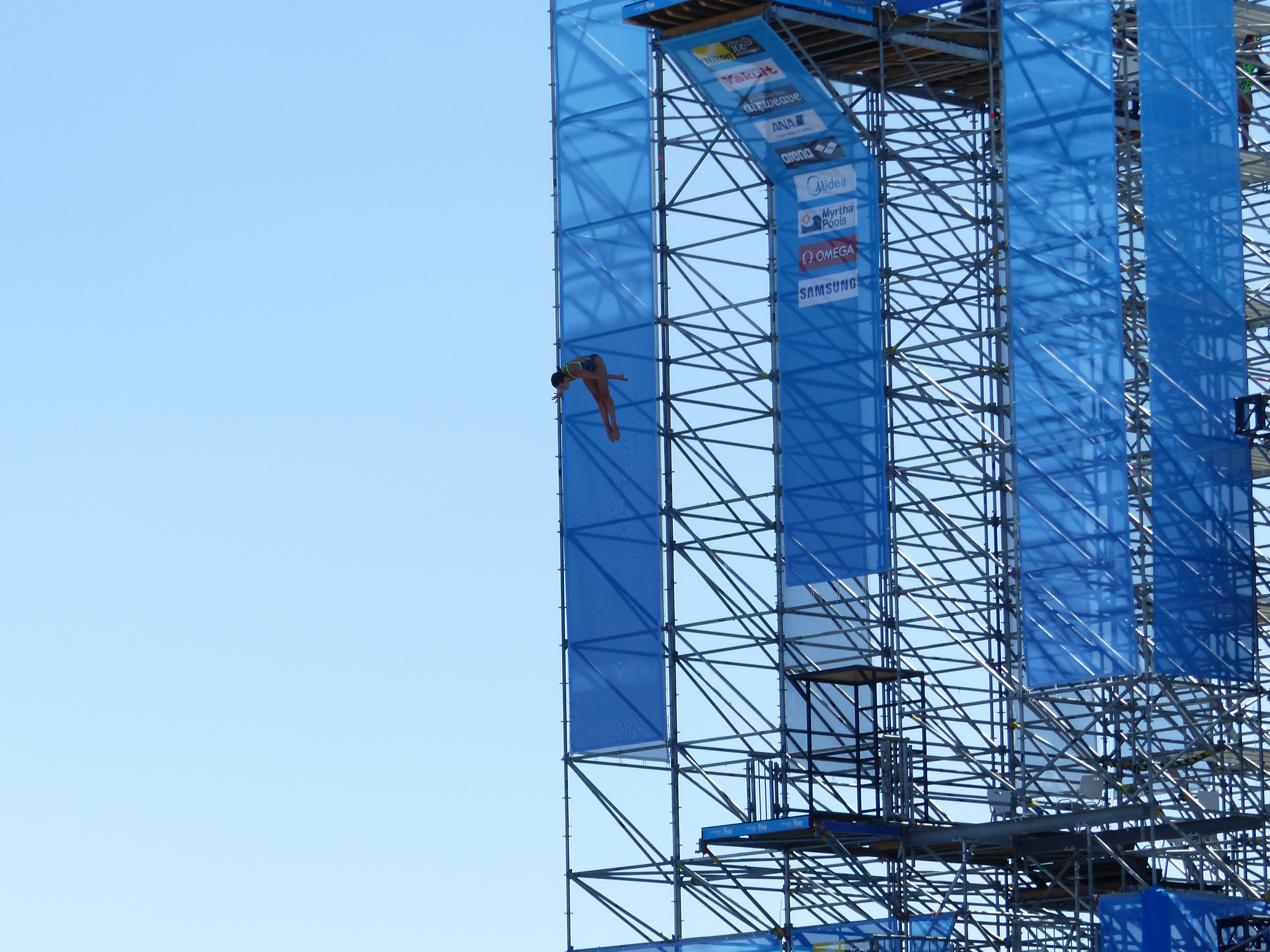
Bader during a dive

== Other ==
In 2014 is coach for Calzedonia Ocean Girls.
