= Adriana Jiménez =

Mexican high diver

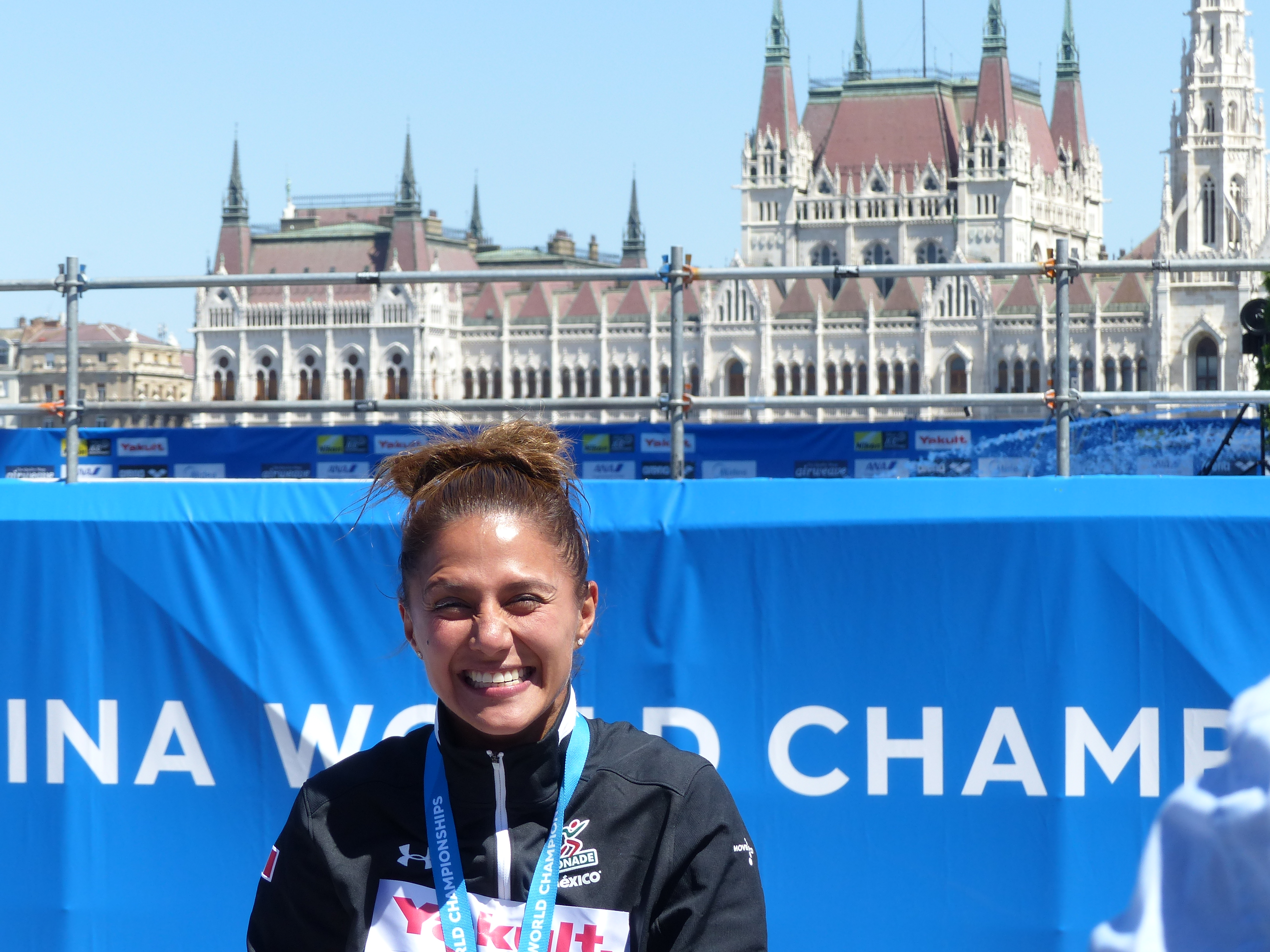

Personal information
- Nationality: Mexican
- Born: 20 January 1985 (age 41)
- Height: 1.58 m (5 ft 2 in)
- Weight: 48 kg (106 lb)

Sport
- Country: Mexico
- Sport: High diving
Medal record
World Championships
Silver medal – second place	2017 Budapest	Women
Silver medal – second place	2019 Gwangju	Women

Adriana Jiménez (born 20 January 1985) is a Mexican high diver. She participated at the 2019 World Aquatics Championships, winning a medal.
