= Ganga Seneviratne =

Sri Lankan national swimmer (born 2003)

Ganga Senavirathne
Personal information
- Full name: Malwaththage Ganga Sri Dewmini Senavirathne
- National team: Sri Lanka
- Born: 27 May 2003 (age 23) Colombo, Sri Lanka
- Education: Visakha Vidyalaya University of Debrecen, Hungary
- Height: 170 cm (5 ft 7 in)
- Weight: 62 kg (137 lb)

Sport
- Sport: Swimming
- Strokes: Backstroke
- Club: Killer Whale Aquatic Club
- Coach: Manoj Abeysinghe

Ganga Senavirathne (born 27 May 2003) is a Sri Lankan swimmer, specialising in the backstroke. Senavirathne represented Sri Lanka at the Paris Olympics 2024.

== Career ==
Her first Sri Lankan representation was at South Asian Aquatic Championships in Colombo, Sri Lanka 2016. Since then she has represented Sri Lanka at the 2017 Asian Age Group Championships held in Tashkent, Uzbekistan. In 2019 she competed in South Asian Games which was held in Katmandu, Nepal, where she won 3 silver medals and 1 bronze medal. In the same year she represented Sri Lanka at the FINA Junior World Championships in Budapest, Hungary. Later in 2019 Senavirathne represented the country at the World School Games which was held in Rio de Janeiro and made it to B finals in her event. In year 2021 she competed at the FINA World Swimming Championships in Abu Dhabi, UAE.

=== 2022 ===
She won the 50m, 100m, and 200m backstroke as well as the 100m freestyle at the Sri Lankan Selection Trials in January 2022. She was selected for the 2022 World Swimming Championships in Budapest in June 2022. However, she was one of five Sri Lankan swimmers unable to compete due to a VISA issue which prevented them from entering the country. She competed at the 2022 Commonwealth Games in Birmingham, England in August 2022 in the 200m backstroke.

=== 2023 ===
In June 2023, she won silver in the 200m backstroke at the Singapore Championships. She also finished fourth in both the 50m and 100m backstroke at the same event. She participated in 2023 World Aquatics Championships held in Fukuoka, Japan. She competed in the 200m backstroke at the delayed 2022 Asian Games held in September 2023 in Hangzhou, China. She won the 50m backstroke at the Sri Lankan Senior National Championships in Kandy in December 2023.

=== 2024 ===
In February 2024, she competed at the 2024 World Swimming Championships in Doha in the women's 100m backstroke. In January 2024, she scored the most FINA points of all the female competitors at the Sri Lankan National Short Course Swimming Championship due to her performances in the backstroke. In June 2024, she was selected to compete in the backstroke at the 2024 Paris Olympics.

== Personal life ==
She was educated at Visakha Vidyalaya in Colombo, Sri Lanka. She is a member of Killer Whale Aquatics. She’s currently pursuing her bachelor’s degree at the University of Debrecen, Hungary as a physiotherapy student.
