= Yana Nestsiarava =

Belarusian high diver

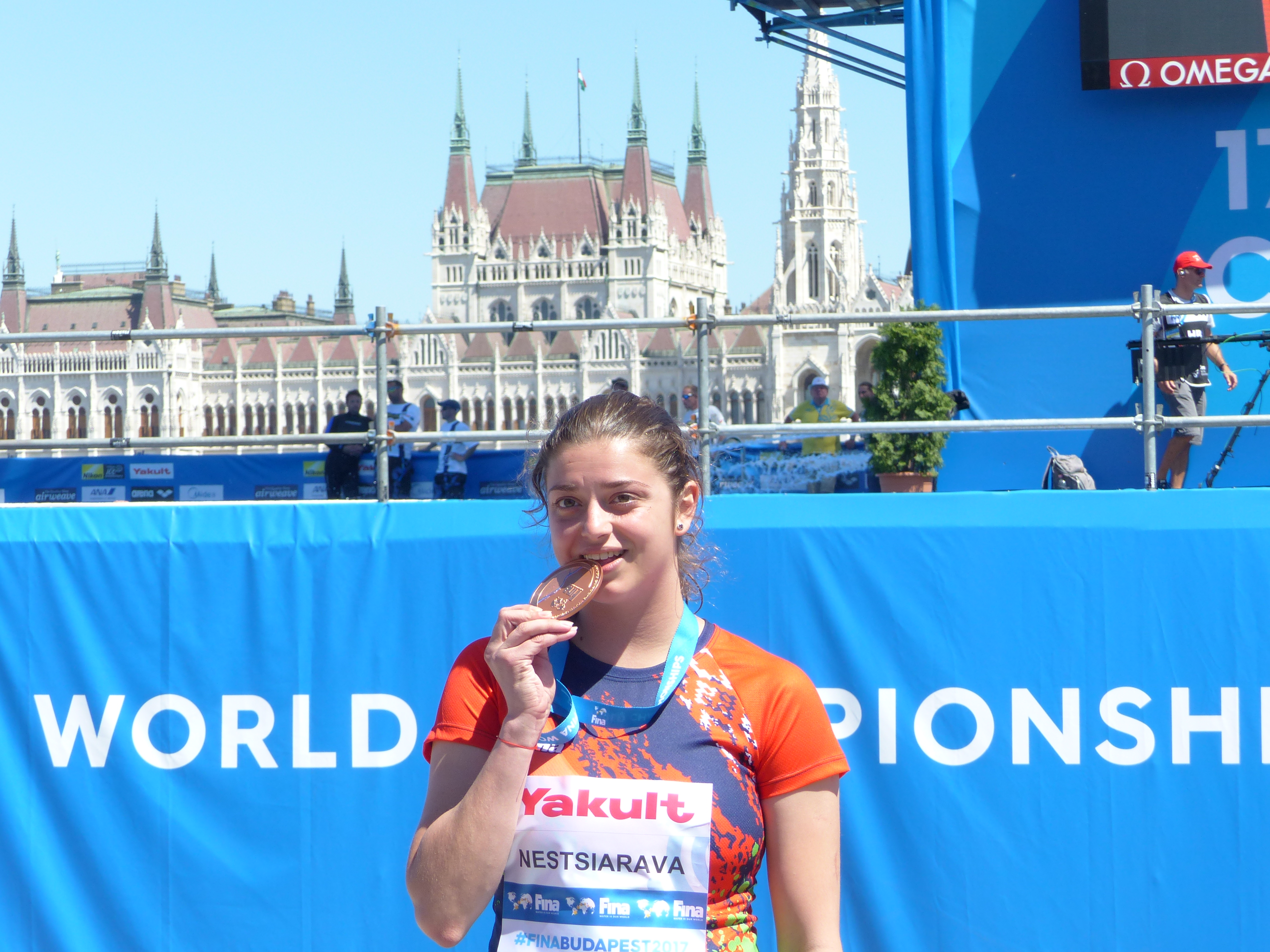
- Nestsiarava in 2017

Personal information
- Born: 14 June 1992 (age 34)
- Height: 167 cm (5 ft 6 in)
- Weight: 58 kg (128 lb)

Sport
- Sport: High diving
Medal record
High diving
Representing Belarus
World Aquatics Championships
Bronze medal – third place	2015 Kazan	Women
Bronze medal – third place	2017 Budapest	Women
FINA Aquatics Festival
Bronze medal – third place	2021 Abu Dhabi	20 m high dive
- Updated on 8 September 2022

Yana Nestsiarava (Belarusian: Яна Несцерава; born 14 June 1992) is a Belarusian female high diver. She won the bronze medal at the 2015 World Aquatics Championships in the women's high diving. Two years later at the 2017 Championships she achieved the same result, taking bronze in the women's high diving event.

Competed in Red Bull Cliff Diving 2022 as a neutral athlete. Reason unknown.
