= FINA athletes at the World Aquatics Championships =

From 2015 to 2022 when the World Aquatics was still known as FINA (Fédération internationale de natation; International Swimming Federation), neutral athletes have competed under the designation Independent FINA Athlete (IFA) either due to their national federation's suspension of their governing body or as refugees.

Refugees have competed under the designation Athlete Refugee Team (ART) under the World Aquatics banner at the World Championships since 2023.

== 2015 World Aquatics Championships ==
At the 2015 World Aquatics Championships, Sri Lanka's national federation was suspended from recognition and therefore not allowed to be represented at the championships. Consequently, athletes from Sri Lanka swam under a "FINA" banner at the championships as independent athletes. The 2015 World Championships were 24 July to 9 August 2015 in Kazan, Russia.

Four swimmers from Sri Lanka competed in nine different events, including two medley races.

Men

Athlete	Event	Heat		Semifinal		Final	
Athlete	Event	Time	Rank	Time	Rank	Time	Rank
Matthew Abeysinghe	100 m freestyle	50.93	54	Did not advance			
Cherantha de Silva	50 m freestyle	24.32	64	Did not advance			
Cherantha de Silva	100 m butterfly	57.79	60	Did not advance			

Women

Athlete	Event	Heat		Semifinal		Final	
Athlete	Event	Time	Rank	Time	Rank	Time	Rank
Kimiko Raheem	100 m backstroke	1:05.61	49	Did not advance			
Kimiko Raheem	200 m backstroke	2:21.18	41	Did not advance			
Machiko Raheem	50 m freestyle	27.49	63	Did not advance			
Machiko Raheem	100 m freestyle	59.50	64	Did not advance			

Mixed

Athlete	Event	Heat		Final	
Athlete	Event	Time	Rank	Time	Rank
Matthew Abeysinghe; Machiko Raheem; Cherantha de Silva; Kimiko Raheem	4 × 100 m freestyle relay	3:42.94	17	Did not advance	
Kimiko Raheem; Machiko Raheem; Matthew Abeysinghe; Cherantha de Silva	4 × 100 m medley relay	4:19.24	22	Did not advance	

== 2017 World Aquatics Championships ==
At the 2017 World Aquatics Championships, FINA allowed refugees to participate under the FINA banner as independent athletes. The competition took place in Budapest, Hungary from 14 July to 30 July. The two swimmers partook in two events each.

Athlete	Event	Heat		Semifinal		Final	
Athlete	Event	Time	Rank	Time	Rank	Time	Rank
Rami Anis	Men's 100 m butterfly	55.66	58	Did not advance			
Rami Anis	Men's 200 m butterfly	2:06.02	40	Did not advance			
Yusra Mardini	Women's 200 m freestyle	2:15.80	47	Did not advance			
Yusra Mardini	Women's 100 m butterfly	1:07.99	41	Did not advance			

== 2019 World Aquatics Championships ==
At the 2019 World Aquatics Championships, FINA allowed refugees to participate under the FINA banner as independent athletes. The competition took place in Gwangju, South Korea from 12 to 28 July. The two swimmers partook in two events each.

Men

Athlete	Event	Heat		Semifinal		Final	
Athlete	Event	Time	Rank	Time	Rank	Time	Rank
Rami Anis	50 m butterfly	26.24	68	Did not advance			
Rami Anis	100 m butterfly	57.26	60	Did not advance			

Women

Athlete	Event	Heat		Semifinal		Final	
Athlete	Event	Time	Rank	Time	Rank	Time	Rank
Yusra Mardini	100 m freestyle	1:01.75	73	Did not advance			
Yusra Mardini	100 m butterfly	1:08.79	47	Did not advance			

== 2022 World Aquatics Championships ==
At the 2022 World Aquatics Championships, FINA allowed refugees to participate under the FINA banner as independent athletes. The competition took place in Budapest, Hungary from 18 June to 3 July. The three swimmers partook in two events each.

Men

Athlete	Event	Heat		Semifinal		Final	
Athlete	Event	Time	Rank	Time	Rank	Time	Rank
Alaa Maso	50 m freestyle	Did not start		Did not advance			
Alaa Maso	100 m freestyle	52.45	66	Did not advance			
Eyad Masoud	50 m butterfly	25.27	53	Did not advance			
Eyad Masoud	100 m butterfly	59.78	58	Did not advance			

Women

Athlete	Event	Heat		Semifinal		Final	
Athlete	Event	Time	Rank	Time	Rank	Time	Rank
Yusra Mardini	50 m freestyle	28.95	65	Did not advance			
Yusra Mardini	50 m butterfly	30.08	50	Did not advance			

== 2023 World Aquatics Championships ==
At the 2023 World Aquatics Championships, World Aquatics allowed refugees to participate under the World Aquatics banner as independent athletes (code:ART). The competition took place in Fukuoka, Japan from 14 to 30 July. The two swimmers partook in two events each.

Men

Athlete	Event	Heat		Semifinal		Final	
Athlete	Event	Time	Rank	Time	Rank	Time	Rank
Alaa Maso	50 metre freestyle	23.74	67	Did not advance			
Alaa Maso	100 metre freestyle	51.76	68	Did not advance			
Eyad Masoud	50 metre butterfly	25.73	64	Did not advance			
Eyad Masoud	100 metre butterfly	58.91	64	Did not advance			

== 2024 World Aquatics Championships ==
At the 2024 World Aquatics Championships, World Aquatics allowed refugees to participate under the World Aquatics banner as independent athletes (code:ART). The competition took place in Doha, Qatar from 2 to 18 February. The two swimmers partook in two events each.

Men

Athlete	Event	Heat		Semifinal		Final	
Athlete	Event	Time	Rank	Time	Rank	Time	Rank
Alaa Maso	50 metre freestyle	23.73	55	Did not advance			
Alaa Maso	100 metre freestyle	52.05	60	Did not advance			
Eyad Masoud	50 metre butterfly	25.38	42	Did not advance			
Eyad Masoud	100 metre butterfly	58.61	55	Did not advance			

== 2025 World Aquatics Championships ==
At the 2025 World Aquatics Championships, World Aquatics allowed refugees to participate under the World Aquatics banner as independent athletes (code:ART). The competition took place in Singapore from 11 July to 3 August. The three swimmers partook in five events.

Men

Athlete	Event	Heat		Semifinal		Final	
Athlete	Event	Time	Rank	Time	Rank	Time	Rank
Alaa Maso	50 m freestyle	DNS		Did not advance			
Matin Balsini	100 m freestyle	53.62	75	Did not advance			
Matin Balsini	50 m butterfly	25.69	=70	Did not advance			
Mohamad Eyad Masoud	50 m breaststroke	30.54	68	Did not advance			
Mohamad Eyad Masoud	100 m butterfly	59.01	71	Did not advance			

== See also ==
- Suspended Member Federation at the World Aquatics Championships
