= 2024 Red Bull Cliff Diving World Series =

- Sport: Cliff diving
- Duration: 26 May 2024 – 10 November 2024

Men
- Overall: Aidan Heslop

Women
- Overall: Rhiannan Iffland

Seasons
- ← 2023 2025 →

The 2024 Red Bull Cliff Diving World Series was a season of the Red Bull-sponsored international cliff diving series. It is the 16th edition of this event. The series began on 26 May in Athens, Greece, with the final event being held on 10 November 2024 in Sydney, Australia.

== Calendar ==
Date	Location	Ref.
26 May	Athens, Greece	
8 June	Boston, United States	
30 June	Polignano a Mare, Italy	
20 July	Causeway Coast, Northern Ireland	
10 August	Oslo, Norway	
25 August	Montreal, Canada	
29 September	Antalya, Turkey	
10 November	Sydney, Australia	

== Divers ==
The men's series features 8 permanent divers, with four wildcard divers selected to compete at each event. Whilst this season of the women's series have 7 permanent divers, with 5 wildcard divers selected at each event.

=== Changes in Lineup ===
The 2024 season saw four new permanent divers with Carlos Gimeno and Jonathan Paredes becoming permanent divers in the Men's series. María Quintero and Simone Leathead were the new permanent divers in the Women's series.

Gary Hunt decided he will not compete as a permanent diver in the 2024 series to focus on his participation in the 2024 Olympics in Paris, bringing to end a run of 98 consecutive competition starts in the Red Bull Cliff Diving World Series. Miguel García competes as a wild card diver having finished lowest of the permanent divers in the 2023 series.

In the Women's series, Jessica Macaulay retired from the Red Bull Cliff Diving series following the 2023 season. Iris Schmidbauer took a break from competing due to pregnancy, but confirmed plans to return to the series. Yana Nestsiarava competes as a wild card diver having placed lowest among the permanent divers in the 2023 series.

Permanent divers for the 2024 series:

Men

- (Authorised Neutral Athletes) Nikita Fedotov
- (Spain) Carlos Gimeno
- (United Kingdom) Aidan Heslop
- (United States) James Lichtenstein
- (Mexico) Jonathan Paredes
- (Romania) Constantin Popovici
- (Romania) Cătălin Preda
- (Ukraine) Oleksiy Pryhorov

Women

- (Canada) Molly Carlson
- (United States) Meili Carpenter
- (Australia) Rhiannan Iffland
- (Canada) Simone Leathead
- (Australia) Xantheia Pennisi
- (Colombia) María Quintero
- (United States) Eleanor Smart

== Standings ==
The 2024 series adapted a new points system for the championship standings. The dive scores per event determines the standings for the individual event, and championship points are handed out based on final position for the event. Scoring the 12 athletes, including wildcards 20-16-13-10-8-7-6-5-4-3-2-1 points.

=== Men ===
The men's series features eight events. The 8 permanent divers are joined at each event by at least four wildcard divers.

Men's Standings
Pos.	Event Diver	Athens	Boston	Polignano a Mare	Causeway Coast	Oslo	Montreal	Antalya	Sydney	Points total
1	Aidan Heslop (GBR)	7	20	11	19	16	20	20	8	121
2	Constantin Popovici (ROU)	20	2	20	16	13	16	7	13	107
3	James Lichtenstein (USA)	13	16	16	14	20	10	8	4	101
4	Carlos Gimeno (ESP)	16	4	8	10	8	8	10	16	80
5	Oleksiy Pryhorov (UKR)	5	7	4	5	1	5	16	20	63
6	Yolotl Martinez (MEX)	-	11	6	6	7	13	3	6	52
7	Jonathan Paredes (MEX)	8	1	13	4	11	2	5	1	45
8	Andrea Barnaba (ITA)	-	-	7	-	7	-	13	8	35.1
9	Nikita Fedotov (ANA)	-	13	2	4	4	4	2	6	35
10	Sergio Guzman (MEX)	2	-	5	8	-	7	-	10	32
11	David Colturi (USA)	3	8	-	5	5	1	6	2	30
12	Miguel García (COL)	6	6	3	6	3	-	-	3	27
13	Cătălin Preda (ROU)	11	3	-	-	-	-	-	-	14
14	Gary Hunt (FRA)	-	-	-	-	-	4	4	-	8
15	Braden Rumpit (NZL)	1	5	-	-	-	-	-	-	6
16	Matthew Cooper (USA)	4	-	-	-	-	-	-	-	4
17	Archie Biggin (GBR)	-	-	-	1	2	-	-	-	3
18	Pierrick Schafer (SUI)	-	-	-	2	-	-	-	-	2
18	Charles Labadie (CAN)	-	-	-	-	-	2	-	-	2
20	Davide Baraldi (ITA)	-	-	1	-	-	-	-	-	1
20	Kivanc Gür (TUR)	-	-	-	-	-	-	1	-	1

Key

First place
Second place
Third place
Wildcard diver

=== Women ===
The women's series features eight events. The 7 permanent divers are joined at each event by at least five wildcard divers.

Women's Standings
Pos.	Event Diver	Athens	Boston	Polignano a Mare	Causeway Coast	Oslo	Montreal	Antalya	Sydney	Points total
1	Rhiannan Iffland (AUS)	16	21	20	21	21	16	21	21	157
2	Molly Carlson (CAN)	20	13	13	13	16	21	16	–	112
3	Simone Leathead (CAN)	14	8	7	2	4	4	13	16	68
4	Meili Carpenter (USA)	6	10	4	7	8	6	10	7	68
5	Kaylea Arnett (USA)	–	16	17	-	–	13	8	3	57
6	Ginni van Katwijk (NED)	–	7	8	16	7	7	3	4	52
7	María Quintero (COL)	7	6	5	10	6	5	5	6	50
8	Xantheia Pennisi (AUS)	8	1	10	5	1	–	7	10	42
9	Elisa Cosetti (ITA)	10	–	6	–	13	–	1	8	38.1
10	Eleanor Smart (USA)	2	4	3	8	3	10	6	2	38
11	Nelli Chukanivska (UKR)	–	–	–	–	5	8	4	13	30
12	Anna Bader (GER)	5	–	–	–	10	–	–	–	15
13	Morgane Herculano (SUI)	–	2	–	6	–	3	–	–	11
14	Paty Valente (BRA)	4	–	–	4	–	–	–	–	8.1
14	Madeleine Bayon (FRA)	–	3	2	3	–	–	–	–	8
16	Aimee Harrison (CAN)	1	5	–	–	–	1	–	–	7
17	Stella Forsyth (AUS)	–	–	–	–	–	–	–	5	5
18	Yana Nestsiarava (ANA)	3	–	1	–	–	–	–	–	4
19	Paula Gilabert (ESP)	–	–	–	1	2	–	–	–	3
20	Zita Bernatsky (CAN)	–	–	–	–	–	–	2	–	2.1
21	Carlota Gonzales Pereiro (ESP)	–	–	–	–	–	2	–	–	2

Key

First place
Second place
Third place
Wildcard diver
