= High diving at the 2025 World Aquatics Championships – Women =

Women at the High diving at the 2025 World Aquatics Championships
- Venue: Sentosa Island
- Location: Singapore
- Dates: 24 July (Round 1–2); 25 July (Round 3–4); 26 July (Round 5–6)
- Competitors: 16 from 11 nations
- Winning points: 359.25

Medalists
gold medal	Rhiannan Iffland	Australia
silver medal	Simone Leathead	Canada
bronze medal	Maya Kelly	United States

The 2025 World Aquatics Championships women's high diving competition was held from 24 to 26 July 2025.

== Results ==
The first two rounds were started on 24 July at 11:02. The rounds 3 and 4 were started on 25 July at 11:02. Round 5 was started on 26 July at 11:02. The final round was started on 26 July at 14:00.

Rank	Diver	Nationality	Round 1	Round 2	Round 3	Round 4	Round 5	Round 6	Total
1st place, gold medalist(s)	Rhiannan Iffland	Australia	66.30	103.20	85.00	96.90	105.35	102.60	359.25
2nd place, silver medalist(s)	Simone Leathead	Canada	59.80	61.60	83.30	66.00	81.40	90.00	314.50
3rd place, bronze medalist(s)	Maya Kelly	United States	59.80	77.70	71.40	78.00	88.80	90.00	310.00
4	Kaylea Arnett	United States	52.00	94.00	79.90	96.35	94.00	65.60	291.50
5	Isabel Pérez	Colombia	54.60	66.30	76.80	96.00	57.80	98.00	287.20
6	Ginni van Katwijk	Netherlands	54.60	70.20	76.50	79.80	79.95	74.10	285.15
7	María Quintero	Colombia	55.90	90.20	66.30	81.70	82.00	74.10	278.30
8	Elisa Cosetti	Italy	57.20	45.90	64.60	91.20	64.60	91.20	277.60
9	Molly Carlson	Canada	68.90	96.90	64.60	92.40	98.80	39.60	271.90
10	Xantheia Pennisi	Australia	37.70	79.95	68.00	90.30	83.85	79.95	269.50
11	Meili Carpenter	United States	54.60	76.05	72.00	68.80	72.15	58.05	256.80
12	Morgane Herculano	Switzerland	27.30	70.00	71.40	79.80	87.40	68.00	254.10
13	Alejandra Aguilar	Mexico	57.20	34.20	78.20	96.75	70.30	38.70	244.40
14	Madeleine Bayon	France	46.80	75.85	69.70	66.50	51.80	64.60	232.90
15	Iris Schmidbauer	Germany	62.40	39.90	55.80	64.60	Did not advance		
16	Annika Bornebusch	Denmark	36.40	43.20	42.00	54.45	Did not advance		
