= 2023 Red Bull Cliff Diving World Series =

- Sport: Cliff diving
- Duration: 3 June 2023 – 28 January 2024

Men
- Overall: Constantin Popovici

Women
- Overall: Rhiannan Iffland

Seasons
- ← 2022 2024 →

The 2023 Red Bull Cliff Diving World Series was a season of the Red Bull-sponsored international cliff diving series. It is the 15th edition of this event. The series began on 3 June in Boston, United States, with the final event on 28 January 2024 in Auckland, New Zealand.

== Calendar ==
The 2023 calendar includes six locations, with the final event on 28 January 2024 in Auckland. The Auckland event was originally set to take place in November 2023 but was postponed due to a sewer collapse.

Date	Location	Ref.
3 June	Boston, United States	
18 June	Paris, France	
2 July	Polignano a Mare, Italy	
3 August	Takachiho, Miyazaki, Japan	
9 September	Mostar, Bosnia and Herzegovina	
28 January	Auckland, New Zealand	

== Divers ==
The men's and women's series features 8 permanent divers. In addition to the permanent divers, at least four wildcard divers are selected to compete at each stop of the men's and women's series.

Permanent divers for the 2023 series:

Men

- Nikita Fedotov
- (Colombia) Miguel García
- (France) Gary Hunt
- (United Kingdom) Aidan Heslop
- (United States) James Lichtenstein
- (Romania) Constantin Popovici
- (Romania) Cătălin Preda
- (Ukraine) Oleksiy Pryhorov

Women

- (Canada) Molly Carlson
- (United States) Meili Carpenter
- (Australia) Rhiannan Iffland
- (Canada) Jessica Macaulay
- Yana Nestsiarava
- (Australia) Xantheia Pennisi
- (Germany) Iris Schmidbauer
- (United States) Eleanor Smart

== Standings ==
At every event, each competing diver performs four dives. The diver with the highest cumulative score after all four dives is declared the winner, and is awarded 200 points. Further points are awarded to all divers who competed at the event, based on their finishing position.

=== Men ===
The men's series features six events. The 8 permanent divers are joined at each event by at least four wildcard divers.

Men's Standings
Pos.	Event Diver	Boston	Paris	Polignano a Mare	Takachiho	Mostar	Auckland	Points total
1	Constantin Popovici (ROU)	210	200	160	170	92	200	1032
2	Aidan Heslop (GBR)	130	39	200	200	130	110	809
3	Carlos Gimeno (ESP)	160	92	92	29	200	130	703
4	Cătălin Preda (ROU)	50	76	140	92	170	170	698
5	Gary Hunt (FRA)	110	110	50	110	62	20	462
5	Oleksiy Pryhorov (UKR)	12	160	76	12	110	92	462
7	Nikita Fedotov (ANA)	76	130	62	62	76	39	445
8	James Lichtenstein (USA)	92	20	29	130	39	76	386
9	Jonathan Paredes (MEX)	39	50	110	-	50	12	261
10	David Colturi (USA)	62	72	-	39	-	62	235
11	Miguel García (COL)	20	29	20	76	29	50	224
12	Sergio Guzman (MEX)	29	-	39	-	-	-	68
13	Matthew Cooper (USA)	-	-	-	50	-	-	50
14	Braden Rumpit (NZL)	-	-	-	-	-	29	29
15	Kyohei Arata (JPN)	-	-	-	20	-	-	20
15	Nathan Jimerson (USA)	-	-	-	-	20	-	20
17	Artem Silchenko (ANA)	-	12	-	-	-	-	12
17	Davide Baraldi (ITA)	-	-	12	-	-	-	12
17	Matthias Appenzeller (SUI)	-	-	-	-	12	-	12

Key

First place
Second place
Third place
Wildcard diver

=== Women ===
The women's series features seven events. The six permanent divers are joined at each event by at least four wildcard divers.

Women's Standings
Pos.	Event Diver	Boston	Paris	Polignano a Mare	Takachiho	Mostar	Auckland	Points total
1	Rhiannan Iffland (AUS)	210	200	210	210	160	210	1200
2	Molly Carlson (CAN)	160	170	160	160	210	110	970
3	Xantheia Pennisi (AUS)	130	-	130	130	50	160	600
4	Eleanor Smart (USA)	29	92	76	110	130	92	529
5	Meili Carpenter (USA)	92	50	110	92	92	62	498
6	Jessica Macaulay (CAN)	110	110	-	62	76	130	488
7	Iris Schmidbauer (GER)	62	130	92	76	39	20	419
8	Yana Nestsiarava (ANA)	20	62	29	-	110	29	250
9	María Quintero (COL)	50	-	62	-	62	76	250
10	Simone Leathead (CAN)	-	76	-	39	29	39	183
11	Elisa Cosetti (ITA)	76	-	50	20	-	-	146
12	Paty Valente (BRA)	-	-	-	50	20	12	82
13	Aimee Harrison (CAN)	39	-	39	-	-	-	78
14	Emily Chinnock (AUS)	-	-	-	-	-	50	50
15	Madeleine Bayon (FRA)	-	20	-	29	-	-	49
16	Anna Bader (GER)	-	39	-	-	-	-	39
17	Celia Fernandez (ESP)	-	29	-	-	-	-	29
18	Susanna Fish (USA)	12	-	-	-	-	-	12
18	Genevieve Sangpan (USA)	-	12	-	-	-	-	12
18	Ginni van Katwijk (NED)	-	-	-	12	-	-	12
18	Annika Bornebusch (DEN)	-	-	-	-	12	-	12

Key

First place
Second place
Third place
Wildcard diver
