= United States at the 2025 World Aquatics Championships =

- Flag of the United States
- World Aquatics code: USA
- National federation: United States Aquatic Sports
- Website: usaquaticsports.org

in Singapore
- Competitors: 119 in 6 sports
- Medals Ranked 3rd: Gold 10 Silver 11 Bronze 11 Total 32

World Aquatics Championships appearances
- 1973; 1975; 1978; 1982; 1986; 1991; 1994; 1998; 2001; 2003; 2005; 2007; 2009; 2011; 2013; 2015; 2017; 2019; 2022; 2023; 2024; 2025

The United States competed at the 2025 World Aquatics Championships in Singapore from July 11 to August 3, 2025.

== Athletes by discipline ==
The following is the number of competitors who will participate at the Championships per discipline.

Sport	Men	Women	Total
Artistic swimming	0	9	9
Diving	11	9	20
High diving	3	3	6
Open water swimming	4	3	7
Swimming	26	21	47
Water polo	15	15	30
Total	59	60	119

== Medalists ==
Medal	Name	Sport	Event	Date
1st place, gold medalist(s)	James Lichtenstein	High diving	Men's event	27 July 2025
1st place, gold medalist(s)	Gretchen Walsh	Swimming	Women's 100 m butterfly	28 July 2025
1st place, gold medalist(s)	Katie Ledecky	Swimming	Women's 1500 m freestyle	29 July 2025
1st place, gold medalist(s)	Luca Urlando	Swimming	Men's 200 m butterfly	30 July 2025
1st place, gold medalist(s)	Katharine Berkoff	Swimming	Women's 50 m backstroke	31 July 2025
1st place, gold medalist(s)	Kate Douglass	Swimming	Women's 200 m breaststroke	1 August 2025
1st place, gold medalist(s)	Gretchen Walsh	Swimming	Women's 50 m butterfly	2 August 2025
1st place, gold medalist(s)	Katie Ledecky	Swimming	Women's 800 m freestyle	2 August 2025
1st place, gold medalist(s)	Jack Alexy; Patrick Sammon; Kate Douglass; Torri Huske; Chris Guiliano*; Jonny Kulow*; Simone Manuel*	Swimming	Mixed 4 × 100 m freestyle relay	2 August 2025
1st place, gold medalist(s)	Regan Smith; Kate Douglass; Gretchen Walsh; Torri Huske; Katharine Berkoff*; Claire Curzan*; Lilly King*; Simone Manuel*	Swimming	Women's 4 × 100 m medley relay	3 August 2025
2nd place, silver medalist(s)	Simone Manuel; Kate Douglass; Erin Gemmell; Torri Huske; Anna Moesch*	Swimming	Women's 4 × 100 m freestyle relay	27 July 2025
2nd place, silver medalist(s)	Alex Walsh	Swimming	Women's 200 m individual medley	28 July 2025
2nd place, silver medalist(s)	Luke Hobson	Swimming	Men's 200 m freestyle	29 July 2025
2nd place, silver medalist(s)	Regan Smith	Swimming	Women's 100 m backstroke	29 July 2025
2nd place, silver medalist(s)	Kate Douglass	Swimming	Women's 100 m breaststroke	29 July 2025
2nd place, silver medalist(s)	Regan Smith	Swimming	Women's 200 m butterfly	31 July 2025
2nd place, silver medalist(s)	Shaine Casas	Swimming	Men's 200 m individual medley	31 July 2025
2nd place, silver medalist(s)	Jack Alexy	Swimming	Men's 100 m freestyle	31 July 2025
2nd place, silver medalist(s)	Regan Smith	Swimming	Women's 50 m backstroke	31 July 2025
2nd place, silver medalist(s)	Claire Weinstein; Anna Peplowski; Erin Gemmell; Katie Ledecky; Simone Manuel*; Anna Moesch*; Bella Sims*	Swimming	Women's 4 × 200 m freestyle relay	31 July 2025
2nd place, silver medalist(s)	Regan Smith	Swimming	Women's 200 m backstroke	2 August 2025
3rd place, bronze medalist(s)	Maya Kelly	High diving	Women's event	26 July 2025
3rd place, bronze medalist(s)	Katie Ledecky	Swimming	Women's 400 m freestyle	27 July 2025
3rd place, bronze medalist(s)	Jack Alexy; Patrick Sammon; Chris Guiliano; Jonny Kulow; Shaine Casas*; Destin Lasco*	Swimming	Men's 4 × 100 m freestyle relay	27 July 2025
3rd place, bronze medalist(s)	Joshua Hedberg; Carson Tyler	Diving	Men's synchronized 10 m platform	29 July 2025
3rd place, bronze medalist(s)	Katharine Berkoff	Swimming	Women's 100 m backstroke	29 July 2025
3rd place, bronze medalist(s)	Claire Weinstein	Swimming	Women's 200 m freestyle	30 July 2025
3rd place, bronze medalist(s)	Torri Huske	Swimming	Women's 100 m freestyle	1 August 2025
3rd place, bronze medalist(s)	Jack Alexy	Swimming	Men's 50 m freestyle	2 August 2025
3rd place, bronze medalist(s)	Claire Curzan	Swimming	Women's 200 m backstroke	2 August 2025
3rd place, bronze medalist(s)	Bobby Finke	Swimming	Men's 1500 m freestyle	3 August 2025
3rd place, bronze medalist(s)	Tommy Janton; Josh Matheny; Dare Rose; Jack Alexy; Campbell McKean*	Swimming	Men's 4 × 100 m medley relay	3 August 2025

== Artistic swimming ==
Nine athletes were named to the World Championships roster.

Women

Athlete	Event	Preliminaries		Final	
Athlete	Event	Points	Rank	Points	Rank
Ghizal Akbar; Jaime Czarkowski	Duet technical routine	265.7292	11 Q	269.5409	10

Mixed

Athlete	Event	Preliminaries		Final	
Athlete	Event	Points	Rank	Points	Rank
Anita Alvarez; Jaime Czarkowski; Nicole Dzurko; Jacklyn Luu; Daniella Ramirez; Natalia Vega; Morgan Woelfel; Karen Xue	Team acrobatic routine	212.1612	4 Q	198.8750	9
Ghizal Akbar; Anita Alvarez; Jaime Czarkowski; Nicole Dzurko; Jacklyn Luu; Daniella Ramirez; Natalia Vega; Karen Xue	Team technical routine	238.5699	12 Q	273.6650	6
Ghizal Akbar; Anita Alvarez; Jaime Czarkowski; Nicole Dzurko; Jacklyn Luu; Daniella Ramirez; Natalia Vega; Karen Xue	Team free routine	314.2542	4 Q	318.0808	4

== Diving ==
20 athletes were named to the World Championships roster.

Men

Athlete	Event	Preliminaries		Semi-finals		Final	
Athlete	Event	Points	Rank	Points	Rank	Points	Rank
Nick Harris	1 m springboard	339.80	16	—		Did not advance	
Lyle Yost	1 m springboard	304.70	33	—		Did not advance	
Collier Dyer	3 m springboard	381.75	15 Q	393.05	13	Did not advance	
Max Flory	3 m springboard	345.60	34	Did not advance			
Grayson Campbell; Jack Ryan	3 m synchronized springboard	382.68	5 Q	—		374.82	6
Joshua Hedberg	10 m platform	371.00	20	Did not advance			
Jordan Rzepka	10 m platform	449.80	5 Q	410.70	13	Did not advance	
Joshua Hedberg; Carson Tyler	10 m synchronized platform	—				410.70	3rd place, bronze medalist(s)

Women

Athlete	Event	Preliminaries		Semi-finals		Final	
Athlete	Event	Points	Rank	Points	Rank	Points	Rank
Hailey Hernandez	1 m springboard	245.45	9 Q	—		270.45	4
Anna Kwong	1 m springboard	215.35	30	—		Did not advance	
Sophie Verzyl	3 m springboard	307.15	3 Q	255.55	15	Did not advance	
Lily Witte	3 m springboard	255.45	25	Did not advance			
Bailee Sturgill; Lily Witte	3 m synchronized springboard	260.88	6 Q	—		261.18	7
Bayleigh Cranford	10 m platform	302.45	10 Q	310.15	8 Q	329.50	8
Ella Roselli	10 m platform	292.50	11 Q	311.80	7 Q	290.20	11
Bayleigh Cranford; Daryn Wright	10 m synchronized platform	279.75	7 Q	—		274.41	6

Mixed

Athlete	Event	Final	
Athlete	Event	Points	Rank
Luke Hernandez; Kyndal Knight	3 m synchronized springboard	267.60	7
Bayleigh Cranford; Tyler Wills	10 m synchronized platform	296.13	5
Jack Ryan; Carson Tyler; Sophie Verzyl; Daryn Wright	Team	404.90	4

== High diving ==
Six athletes were named to the World Championships roster.

Men

Athlete	Event	Points	Rank
David Colturi	Men's high diving	366.80	8
Scott Lazeroff	Men's high diving	340.95	11
James Lichtenstein	Men's high diving	428.90	1st place, gold medalist(s)

Women

Athlete	Event	Points	Rank
Kaylea Arnett	Women's high diving	291.50	4
Meili Carpenter	Women's high diving	256.80	11
Maya Kelly	Women's high diving	310.00	3rd place, bronze medalist(s)

== Open water swimming ==
Seven athletes were named to the World Championships roster.

Men

Athlete	Event	Heat		Semi-final		Final	
Athlete	Event	Time	Rank	Time	Rank	Time	Rank
Dylan Gravley	Men's 3 km knockout sprints	17:08.60	9 Q	11:37.70	19	Did not advance	
Ivan Puskovitch	Men's 3 km knockout sprints	17:08.80	5 Q	11:31.80	7 Q	6:07.20	=7
Dylan Gravley	Men's 5 km	—				58:15.90	17
Ivan Puskovitch	Men's 5 km	—				1:00:26.30	20
Dylan Gravley	Men's 10 km	—				2:04:04.60	22
Joey Tepper	Men's 10 km	—				2:01:53.80	12

Women

Athlete	Event	Heat		Semi-final		Final	
Athlete	Event	Time	Rank	Time	Rank	Time	Rank
Mariah Denigan	Women's 3 km knockout sprints	18:36.40	=7 Q	12:21.90	17	Did not advance	
Brinkleigh Hansen	Women's 3 km knockout sprints	18:39.20	=12	Did not advance			
Mariah Denigan	Women's 5 km	—				1:04:08.60	13
Brinkleigh Hansen	Women's 5 km	—				1:05:00.60	22
Mariah Denigan	Women's 10 km	—				2:11:54.10	14
Brinkleigh Hansen	Women's 10 km	—				2:19:10.30	24

Mixed

Athlete	Event	Time	Rank
Mariah Denigan; Brooke Travis; Charlie Clark; Joey Tepper	Team relay	1:12:01.60	8

== Swimming ==
On June 8, 2025, 47 athletes were named to the World Championships roster.

Men

Athlete	Event	Heat		Semi-final		Final	
Athlete	Event	Time	Rank	Time	Rank	Time	Rank
Jack Alexy	50 m freestyle	21.52	=2 Q	21.32	2 Q	21.46	3rd place, bronze medalist(s)
Santo Condorelli	50 m freestyle	21.91; 21.83	=16 S/off; 1 Q	21.68	7 Q	21.73	8
Jack Alexy	100 m freestyle	48.07	=10 Q	46.81 AM	1 Q	46.92	2nd place, silver medalist(s)
Patrick Sammon	100 m freestyle	48.04	9 Q	47.62	7 Q	47.58	6
Luke Hobson	200 m freestyle	1:45.61	2 Q	1:44.80	1 Q	1:43.84	2nd place, silver medalist(s)
Gabriel Jett	200 m freestyle	1:45.91	4 Q	1:45.60	8 Q	1:45.92	8
Rex Maurer	400 m freestyle	3:46.38	11	—		Did not advance	
Luka Mijatovic	400 m freestyle	3:59.68	36	—		Did not advance	
Bobby Finke	800 m freestyle	7:44.02	4 Q	—		7:46.42	4
Bobby Finke	1500 m freestyle	14:45.70	5 Q	—		14:36.60	3rd place, bronze medalist(s)
David Johnston	1500 m freestyle	14:56.20	9	—		Did not advance	
Shaine Casas	50 m backstroke	24.97	=20	Did not advance			
Quintin McCarty	50 m backstroke	24.76	=10 Q	24.52	7 Q	24.58	5
Jack Aikins	100 m backstroke	56.54	44	Did not advance			
Tommy Janton	100 m backstroke	53.87	18	Did not advance			
Jack Aikins	200 m backstroke	1:58.56	24	Did not advance			
Keaton Jones	200 m backstroke	1:57.00	15 Q	1:56.20	12	Did not advance	
Michael Andrew	50 m breaststroke	27.37	25	Did not advance			
Campbell McKean	50 m breaststroke	27.32	24	Did not advance			
Josh Matheny	100 m breaststroke	59.40	6 Q	59.15	5 Q	59.26	7
Campbell McKean	100 m breaststroke	59.98	15 Q	59.74	15	Did not advance	
Josh Matheny	200 m breaststroke	DNS		Did not advance			
AJ Pouch	200 m breaststroke	2:08.62	3 Q	2:08.34	2 Q	2:09.13	5
Michael Andrew	50 m butterfly	23.22	15 Q	23.23	16	Did not advance	
Dare Rose	50 m butterfly	23.20	10 Q	23.02	12	Did not advance	
Shaine Casas	100 m butterfly	51.66	19	Did not advance			
Thomas Heilman	100 m butterfly	52.02	26	Did not advance			
Carson Foster	200 m butterfly	1:55.68	12 Q	1:54.30	4 Q	1:54.62	5
Luca Urlando	200 m butterfly	1:52.71	1 Q	1:52.84	1 Q	1:51.87	1st place, gold medalist(s)
Shaine Casas	200 m individual medley	1:57.76	3 Q	1:55.13	2 Q	1:54.30	2nd place, silver medalist(s)
Carson Foster	200 m individual medley	1:58.17	8 Q	1:57.49	8 Q	DNS	
Carson Foster	400 m individual medley	DNS		—		Did not advance	
Rex Maurer	400 m individual medley	4:19.30	20	—		Did not advance	
Jack Alexy; Patrick Sammon; Chris Guiliano; Jonny Kulow; Shaine Casas*; Destin Lasco*	4 × 100 m freestyle relay	3:11.17	1 Q	—		3:09.64	3rd place, bronze medalist(s)
Henry McFadden; Gabriel Jett; Luke Hobson; Rex Maurer; Chris Guiliano*	4 × 200 m freestyle relay	7:06.09	5 Q	—		7:01.24	4
Tommy Janton; Josh Matheny; Dare Rose; Jack Alexy; Campbell McKean*	4 × 100 m medley relay	3:29.65	1 Q	—		3:28.62	3rd place, bronze medalist(s)

Women

Athlete	Event	Heat		Semi-final		Final	
Athlete	Event	Time	Rank	Time	Rank	Time	Rank
Torri Huske	50 m freestyle	24.72	13 Q	24.41	7 Q	24.50	6
Gretchen Walsh	50 m freestyle	24.79	14 Q	24.31	=3 Q	24.40	4
Torri Huske	100 m freestyle	53.99	11 Q	53.21	4 Q	52.89	3rd place, bronze medalist(s)
Gretchen Walsh	100 m freestyle	DNS		Did not advance			
Erin Gemmel	200 m freestyle	1:56.74	2 Q	1:56.03	8 Q	2:00.16	8
Claire Weinstein	200 m freestyle	1:57.38	7 Q	1:54.69	1 Q	1:54.67	3rd place, bronze medalist(s)
Katie Ledecky	400 m freestyle	4:01.04	1 Q	—		3.58.49	3rd place, bronze medalist(s)
Claire Weinstein	400 m freestyle	DNS		—		Did not advance	
Katie Ledecky	800 m freestyle	8:14.62	1 Q	—		8:05.62 CR	1st place, gold medalist(s)
Claire Weinstein	800 m freestyle	8:38.70	17	—		Did not advance	
Jillian Cox	1500 m freestyle	16:09.74	11	—		Did not advance	
Katie Ledecky	1500 m freestyle	15:36.68	1 Q	—		15:26.44	1st place, gold medalist(s)
Katharine Berkoff	50 m backstroke	27.59	=3 Q	27.34	3 Q	27.08	1st place, gold medalist(s)
Regan Smith	50 m backstroke	27.67	5 Q	27.23	1 Q	27.25	2nd place, silver medalist(s)
Katharine Berkoff	100 m backstroke	58.55	2 Q	58.79	4 Q	58.15	3rd place, bronze medalist(s)
Regan Smith	100 m backstroke	58.20	1 Q	58.21	1 Q	57.35	2nd place, silver medalist(s)
Claire Curzan	200 m backstroke	2:08.58	3 Q	2:08.13	3 Q	2:06.04	3rd place, bronze medalist(s)
Regan Smith	200 m backstroke	2:08.65	5 Q	2:08.67	5 Q	2:04.29	2nd place, silver medalist(s)
Lilly King	50 m breaststroke	30.59	10 Q	30.22	4 Q	30.25	5
McKenzie Siroky	50 m breaststroke	30.80	=17	Did not advance			
Kate Douglass	100 m breaststroke	1:06.32	6 Q	1:05.49	1 Q	1:05.27	2nd place, silver medalist(s)
Lilly King	100 m breaststroke	1:06.93	15 Q	1:06.26	9	Did not advance	
Kate Douglass	200 m breaststroke	2:23.28	2 Q	2:20.96	2 Q	2:18.50 CR AM	1st place, gold medalist(s)
Alex Walsh	200 m breaststroke	2:26.56	14 Q	2:25.16	12	Did not advance	
Kate Douglass	50 m butterfly	25.56	=4 Q	25.74	14	Did not advance	
Gretchen Walsh	50 m butterfly	25.22	1 Q	25.09	1 Q	24.83	1st place, gold medalist(s)
Torri Huske	100 m butterfly	DNS		Did not advance			
Gretchen Walsh	100 m butterfly	55.68	1 Q	56.07	=1 Q	54.73 CR	1st place, gold medalist(s)
Caroline Bricker	200 m butterfly	2:09.23	8 Q	2:07.86	6 Q	2:07.59	6
Regan Smith	200 m butterfly	2:08.17	3 Q	2:06.96	3 Q	2:04.99	2nd place, silver medalist(s)
Phoebe Bacon	200 m individual medley	2:11.55	12 Q	2:11.53	13	Did not advance	
Alex Walsh	200 m individual medley	2:09.50	3 Q	2:08.49	2 Q	2:08.58	2nd place, silver medalist(s)
Katie Grimes	400 m individual medley	4:38.26	7 Q	—		4:36.52	6
Emma Weyant	400 m individual medley	4:36.75	5 Q	—		4:34.01	5
Simone Manuel; Kate Douglass; Erin Gemmell; Torri Huske; Anna Moesch*	4 × 100 m freestyle relay	3:33.57	1 Q	—		3:31.04	2nd place, silver medalist(s)
Claire Weinstein; Anna Peplowski; Erin Gemmell; Katie Ledecky; Simone Manuel*; Anna Moesch*; Bella Sims*	4 × 200 m freestyle relay	7:49.43	1 Q	—		7:40.01 AM	2nd place, silver medalist(s)
Regan Smith; Kate Douglass; Gretchen Walsh; Torri Huske; Katharine Berkoff*; Claire Curzan*; Lilly King*; Simone Manuel*	4 × 100 m medley relay	3:54.49	1 Q	—		3:49.34 WR	1st place, gold medalist(s)

Mixed

Athlete	Event	Heat		Final	
Athlete	Event	Time	Rank	Time	Rank
Jack Alexy; Patrick Sammon; Kate Douglass; Torri Huske; Chris Guiliano*; Jonny Kulow*; Simone Manuel*	4 × 100 m freestyle relay	3:21.48	1 Q	3:18.48 WR	1st place, gold medalist(s)
Keaton Jones; Campbell McKean; Torri Huske; Simone Manuel	4 × 100 m medley relay	3:44.50	10	Did not advance	

== Water polo ==
Summary

Team	Event	Group stage				Playoff	Quarterfinal	Semi-final	Final / BM	
Team	Event	Opposition Score	Opposition Score	Opposition Score	Rank	Opposition Score	Opposition Score	Opposition Score	Opposition Score	Rank
United States	Men's tournament	Canada; W 18–9	Brazil; W 16–7	Singapore; W 26–6	1 Q	Bye	Serbia; L 9–14	5th–8th place semifinal Croatia; L 9–14	7th place game Italy; L 8–9	8
United States	Women's tournament	China; W 15–7	Netherlands; W 11–9	Argentina; W 26–3	1 Q	Bye	Japan; W 26–8	Greece; L 10–14	Third place game Spain; L 12–13	4

=== Men's tournament ===
Team roster

The following is the American roster.

Head coach: Dejan Udovičić

- 1 Adrian Weinberg GK
- 2 Jack Larsen FP
- 3 Marko Vavic FP
- 4 Nicolas Saveljic FP
- 5 Hannes Daube FP
- 6 Ben Liecht FP
- 7 Connor Ohl FP
- 8 Dylan Woodhead FP
- 9 Jake Ehrhardt FP
- 10 Chase Dodd FP
- 11 Ryder Dodd FP
- 12 Max Irving FP
- 13 Bernardo Herzer GK
- 14 Ryan Ohl FP
- 15 Dom Brown FP

Group play

Pos	Team	Pld	W	PSW	PSL	L	GF	GA	GD	Pts	Qualification
1	United States	3	3	0	0	0	60	22	+38	9	Quarterfinals
2	Brazil	3	1	1	0	1	37	35	+2	5	Playoffs
3	Canada	3	1	0	1	1	42	39	+3	4	Playoffs
4	Singapore (H)	3	0	0	0	3	24	67	−43	0	13–16th place semifinals

Source: Omegatiming
Rules for classification: 1) points; 2) head-to-head points; 3) head-to-head goal difference; 4) head-to-head number of goals scored; 5) Goal difference.
(H) Host

12 July 2025; 10:35	Report	Canada	9–18	United States	OCBC Aquatic Centre, Singapore; Referees: Dasch Barber (RSA), Ivan Raković (SRB)
12 July 2025; 10:35	Report	Score by quarters: 0–3, 2–4, 2–5, 5–6			OCBC Aquatic Centre, Singapore; Referees: Dasch Barber (RSA), Ivan Raković (SRB)
12 July 2025; 10:35	Report	Oussadou 3	Goals	Irving 4	OCBC Aquatic Centre, Singapore; Referees: Dasch Barber (RSA), Ivan Raković (SRB)

14 July 2025; 09:00	Report	United States	16–7	Brazil	OCBC Aquatic Centre, Singapore; Referees: Nicholas Hodgers (AUS), Maxim Gerasimov (GBR)
14 July 2025; 09:00	Report	Score by quarters: 6–1, 2–0, 4–3, 4–3			OCBC Aquatic Centre, Singapore; Referees: Nicholas Hodgers (AUS), Maxim Gerasimov (GBR)
14 July 2025; 09:00	Report	R. Dodd, Irving 4	Goals	Farias 3	OCBC Aquatic Centre, Singapore; Referees: Nicholas Hodgers (AUS), Maxim Gerasimov (GBR)

16 July 2025; 19:10	Report	Singapore	6–26	United States	OCBC Aquatic Centre, Singapore; Referees: Ivan Raković (SRB), Yasser Mehalhel (EGY)
16 July 2025; 19:10	Report	Score by quarters: 0–4, 2–4, 2–10, 2–8			OCBC Aquatic Centre, Singapore; Referees: Ivan Raković (SRB), Yasser Mehalhel (EGY)
16 July 2025; 19:10	Report	See 2	Goals	R. Dodd, Irving 4	OCBC Aquatic Centre, Singapore; Referees: Ivan Raković (SRB), Yasser Mehalhel (EGY)

Quarterfinals

20 July 2025; 19:10	Report	United States	9–14	Serbia	OCBC Aquatic Centre, Singapore; Referees: Georgios Stavridis (GRE), Frank Ohme (GER)
20 July 2025; 19:10	Report	Score by quarters: 1–3, 2–3, 2–4, 4–4			OCBC Aquatic Centre, Singapore; Referees: Georgios Stavridis (GRE), Frank Ohme (GER)
20 July 2025; 19:10	Report	three players 2	Goals	four players 2	OCBC Aquatic Centre, Singapore; Referees: Georgios Stavridis (GRE), Frank Ohme (GER)

5th–8th place semifinal

22 July 2025; 20:00	Report	United States	9–14	Croatia	OCBC Aquatic Centre, Singapore; Referees: Zhang Liang (CHN), Ivan Raković (SRB)
22 July 2025; 20:00	Report	Score by quarters: 1–2, 1–5, 5–3, 2–4			OCBC Aquatic Centre, Singapore; Referees: Zhang Liang (CHN), Ivan Raković (SRB)
22 July 2025; 20:00	Report	C. Dodd, Vavic 2	Goals	Burić 3	OCBC Aquatic Centre, Singapore; Referees: Zhang Liang (CHN), Ivan Raković (SRB)

7th place game

24 July 2025; 16:00	Report	Italy	9–8	United States	OCBC Aquatic Centre, Singapore; Referees: Zhang Liang (CHN), Germán Moller (ARG)
24 July 2025; 16:00	Report	Score by quarters: 3–3, 2–1, 2–2, 2–2			OCBC Aquatic Centre, Singapore; Referees: Zhang Liang (CHN), Germán Moller (ARG)
24 July 2025; 16:00	Report	Di Somma, Ferrero 2	Goals	R. Dodd 3	OCBC Aquatic Centre, Singapore; Referees: Zhang Liang (CHN), Germán Moller (ARG)

=== Women's tournament ===
Team roster

The following is the American roster.

Head coach: Adam Krikorian

- 1 Amanda Longan GK
- 2 Ava Stryker FP
- 3 Tara Prentice FF
- 4 Anna Pearson FP
- 5 Jenna Flynn FP
- 6 Julia Bonaguidi FP
- 7 Jovana Sekulic FP
- 8 Ryann Neushul FP
- 9 Jewel Roemer FP
- 10 Emma Lineback FP
- 11 Emily Ausmus FP
- 12 Ella Woodhead FP
- 13 Isabel Williams GK
- 14 Rachel Gazzaniga FP
- 15 Malia Allen FP

Group play

Pos	Team	Pld	W	PSW	PSL	L	GF	GA	GD	Pts	Qualification
1	United States	3	3	0	0	0	52	19	+33	9	Quarterfinals
2	Netherlands	3	2	0	0	1	47	24	+23	6	Playoffs
3	China	3	1	0	0	2	43	37	+6	3	Playoffs
4	Argentina	3	0	0	0	3	18	80	−62	0	13–16th place semifinals

Source: Omegatiming
Rules for classification: 1) points; 2) head-to-head points; 3) head-to-head goal difference; 4) head-to-head number of goals scored; 5) Goal difference.

11 July 2025; 12:10	Report	United States	15–7	China	OCBC Aquatic Centre, Singapore; Referees: Marta Cabanas (ESP), Chisato Kurosaki (JPN)
11 July 2025; 12:10	Report	Score by quarters: 3–1, 4–3, 6–1, 2–2			OCBC Aquatic Centre, Singapore; Referees: Marta Cabanas (ESP), Chisato Kurosaki (JPN)
11 July 2025; 12:10	Report	Ausmus, Lineback 3	Goals	Wang H. 2	OCBC Aquatic Centre, Singapore; Referees: Marta Cabanas (ESP), Chisato Kurosaki (JPN)

13 July 2025; 20:45	Report	Netherlands	9–11	United States	OCBC Aquatic Centre, Singapore; Referees: Aurély Blanchard (FRA), Boris Margeta (SLO)
13 July 2025; 20:45	Report	Score by quarters: 2–3, 3–4, 1–2, 3–2			OCBC Aquatic Centre, Singapore; Referees: Aurély Blanchard (FRA), Boris Margeta (SLO)
13 July 2025; 20:45	Report	L. Rogge 3	Goals	Ausmus 3	OCBC Aquatic Centre, Singapore; Referees: Aurély Blanchard (FRA), Boris Margeta (SLO)

15 July 2025; 09:00	Report	Argentina	3–26	United States	OCBC Aquatic Centre, Singapore; Referees: Dasch Barber (RSA), Stanko Ivanovski (MNE)
15 July 2025; 09:00	Report	Score by quarters: 1–6, 1–7, 1–8, 0–5			OCBC Aquatic Centre, Singapore; Referees: Dasch Barber (RSA), Stanko Ivanovski (MNE)
15 July 2025; 09:00	Report	three players 1	Goals	Stryker 6	OCBC Aquatic Centre, Singapore; Referees: Dasch Barber (RSA), Stanko Ivanovski (MNE)

Quarterfinals

19 July 2025; 17:35	Report	United States	26–8	Japan	OCBC Aquatic Centre, Singapore; Referees: Alessia Ferrari (ITA), Marta Cabanas (ESP)
19 July 2025; 17:35	Report	Score by quarters: 10–2, 6–1, 5–2, 5–3			OCBC Aquatic Centre, Singapore; Referees: Alessia Ferrari (ITA), Marta Cabanas (ESP)
19 July 2025; 17:35	Report	Pearson 5	Goals	Sunabe, Ura 2	OCBC Aquatic Centre, Singapore; Referees: Alessia Ferrari (ITA), Marta Cabanas (ESP)

Semifinals

21 July 2025; 17:35	Report	Greece	14–10	United States	OCBC Aquatic Centre, Singapore; Referees: Boris Margeta (SLO), Frank Ohme (GER)
21 July 2025; 17:35	Report	Score by quarters: 2–2, 4–3, 3–3, 5–2			OCBC Aquatic Centre, Singapore; Referees: Boris Margeta (SLO), Frank Ohme (GER)
21 July 2025; 17:35	Report	V. Plevritou 4	Goals	four players 2	OCBC Aquatic Centre, Singapore; Referees: Boris Margeta (SLO), Frank Ohme (GER)

Third place game

23 July 2025; 20:00	Report	United States	12–13	Spain	OCBC Aquatic Centre, Singapore; Referees: Andrej Franulović (CRO), Michiel Zwart (NED)
23 July 2025; 20:00	Report	Score by quarters: 2–4, 2–3, 5–4, 3–2			OCBC Aquatic Centre, Singapore; Referees: Andrej Franulović (CRO), Michiel Zwart (NED)
23 July 2025; 20:00	Report	Lineback 5	Goals	Espar 4	OCBC Aquatic Centre, Singapore; Referees: Andrej Franulović (CRO), Michiel Zwart (NED)
