= High diving at the 2023 World Aquatics Championships – Women =

Women's high diving at the 2023 World Aquatics Championships
- Venue: Seaside Momochi Beach Park
- Location: Fukuoka, Japan
- Dates: 25 July (round 1–2); 26 July (round 3–4)
- Competitors: 20 from 13 nations
- Winning points: 357.40

Medalists
gold medal	Rhiannan Iffland	Australia
silver medal	Molly Carlson	Canada
bronze medal	Jessica Macaulay	Canada

The women's high diving competition at the 2023 World Aquatics Championships was held on 25 and 26 July 2023.

== Results ==
The first two rounds started on 25 July at 11:30. The third round was held on 26 July at 12:00 and the last round at 12:45.

Rank	Diver	Nationality	Round 1	Round 2	Round 3	Round 4	Total
1st place, gold medalist(s)	Rhiannan Iffland	Australia	66.30	94.60	90.10	106.40	357.40
2nd place, silver medalist(s)	Molly Carlson	Canada	58.50	92.00	79.90	92.40	322.80
3rd place, bronze medalist(s)	Jessica Macaulay	Canada	59.80	87.75	71.40	102.00	320.95
4	Simone Leathead	Canada	62.40	91.20	74.80	84.00	312.40
5	Meili Carpenter	United States	54.60	85.80	62.40	96.75	299.55
6	Xantheia Pennisi	Australia	49.40	68.00	81.60	91.20	290.20
7	María Quintero	Colombia	58.50	73.80	76.50	79.80	288.60
8	Patricia Valente	Brazil	50.70	72.20	74.80	66.50	264.20
9	Elisa Cosetti	Italy	55.90	51.30	76.50	74.80	258.50
10	Ellie Smart	United States	58.50	56.70	45.90	87.40	248.50
11	Ginni van Katwijk	Netherlands	32.50	65.10	62.90	72.20	232.70
12	Madeleine Bayon	France	42.90	49.50	62.00	70.40	224.80
13	Iris Schmidbauer	Germany	53.30	38.70	62.90	60.90	215.80
14	Maria Smirnov	United States	53.30	52.70	56.10	46.25	208.35
15	Alejandra Aguilar	Mexico	46.80	62.70	39.15	56.10	204.75
16	Susanna Fish	United States	42.90	41.80	59.50	58.90	203.10
17	Carlota González	Spain	58.50	71.30	47.60	25.60	203.00
18	Morgane Herculano	Switzerland	39.00	44.20	67.20	45.90	196.30
19	Emily Chinnock	Australia	54.60	37.80	71.40	30.40	194.20
20	Annika Bornebusch	Denmark	31.20	48.00	49.50	59.40	188.10
