= High diving at the 2024 World Aquatics Championships – Women =

Women's high diving at the 2024 World Aquatics Championships
- Venue: Old Doha Port
- Location: Doha, Qatar
- Dates: 13 February (round 1–2); 14 February (round 3–4)
- Competitors: 19 from 11 nations
- Winning points: 342.00

Medalists
gold medal	Rhiannan Iffland	Australia
silver medal	Molly Carlson	Canada
bronze medal	Jessica Macaulay	Canada

The women's high diving competition at the 2024 World Aquatics Championships was held on 13 and 14 February 2024.

== Results ==
The first two rounds were started on 13 February at 11:02. Round three was held on 14 February at 11:02. The final round was started on 14 February at 11:41.

Rank	Diver	Nationality	Round 1	Round 2	Round 3	Round 4	Total
1st place, gold medalist(s)	Rhiannan Iffland	Australia	59.80	94.60	85.00	102.60	342.00
2nd place, silver medalist(s)	Molly Carlson	Canada	66.30	102.60	74.80	77.00	320.70
3rd place, bronze medalist(s)	Jessica Macaulay	Canada	61.10	79.95	83.30	96.00	320.35
4	Kaylea Arnett	United States	46.80	90.00	83.30	79.95	300.05
5	Xantheia Pennisi	Australia	63.70	66.65	81.60	80.00	291.95
6	Anna Bader	Germany	62.40	66.30	65.10	98.00	291.80
7	Simone Leathead	Canada	46.80	85.50	71.40	76.00	279.70
8	Elisa Cosetti	Italy	61.10	74.10	61.20	76.50	272.90
9	Eleanor Smart	United States	55.90	84.00	56.10	64.60	260.60
10	María Quintero	Colombia	50.70	65.60	64.60	77.90	258.80
11	Morgane Herculano	Switzerland	62.40	64.60	61.20	69.70	257.90
12	Genevieve Sangpan	United States	44.20	79.80	76.50	49.95	250.45
13	Ginni van Katwijk	Netherlands	37.70	68.40	55.80	62.90	224.80
14	Madeleine Bayon	France	45.50	57.60	44.95	60.80	208.85
15	Maike Halbisch	Germany	45.50	54.45	42.00	54.40	196.35
16	Annika Bornebusch	Denmark	39.00	52.80	43.50	23.10	158.40
–	Iris Schmidbauer	Germany	46.80	46.20	Did not start		
–	Patricia Valente	Brazil	45.50	57.00	Did not start		
–	Emily Chinnock	Australia	52.00	77.90	Did not start		
