= Antonina Vyshyvanova =

Ukrainian female high diver

Personal information
- Native name: Антоніна Вишиванова
- Citizenship: Ukraine
- Born: 27 March 1998 (age 28) Dnipropetrovsk, Ukraine

Sport
- Sport: Diving
Medal record
Women's diving
Representing Ukraine
European Championships
Silver medal – second place	2022 Rome	High diving

Antonina Vyshyvanova (Ukrainian: Антоніна Вишиванова; born 27 March 1998 in Dnipropetrovsk, Ukraine) is a Ukrainian high diver, silver medalist of the 2022 European Championships.

== Career ==
Vyshyvanova started to dive under auspices of her father Oleh Vyshyvanov who participated in the 2009 Red Bull Cliff Diving World Series.

Vyshyvanova's first international competing season was 2019. At the 2019 World Championships in Gwangju, South Korea, she finished 5th in women's high diving. Vyshyvanova was also invited to compete in three out of seven events of the 2019 Red Bull Cliff Diving World Series. She was 8th (out of 9 competitors) in El Nido, the Philippines, 6th (out of 9) in Polignano a Mare, Italy, and 5th (out of 10) in Mostar, Bosnia and Herzegovina. Winning in total 210 points, she ranked 10th.

During the 2021 Red Bull Cliff Diving World Series, Vyshyvanova competed in three of five events. She finished 7th (out of 12) in one of two events in Polignano a Mare, Italy, 6th (out of 10) in Downpatrick Head, Ireland, 11th (out of 12) in Mostar, Bosnia and Herzegovina.

At the 2022 European Championships in Rome, Italy, Vyshyvanova finished second behind Iris Schmidbauer from Germany and ahead of Elisa Cosetti from Italy. It was her first international medal. During the 2022 Red Bull Cliff Diving World Series, Vyshyvanova finished 8th (out of 12) in Mostar, Bosnia and Herzegovina, 9th (out of 12) in Oslo, Norway, 9th (out of 12) in Copenhagen, Denmark, 10th (out of 12) in Boston, United States.
