= High diving at the 2026 European Aquatics Championships – Women =

Women's 20 m platform at the 2026 European Aquatics Championships
- Venue: Pont de Bir-Hakeim
- Dates: 7 August (Round 1–2); 8 August (Round 3–4)
- Competitors: 8 from 7 nations
- Winning points: 324.70

Medalists
gold medal	Nelli Chukanivska	Ukraine
silver medal	Elisa Cosetti	Italy
bronze medal	Maike Halbisch	Germany

The Women's 20 m platform competition at the 2026 European Aquatics Championships was held on 7 and 8 August 2026.

== Results ==
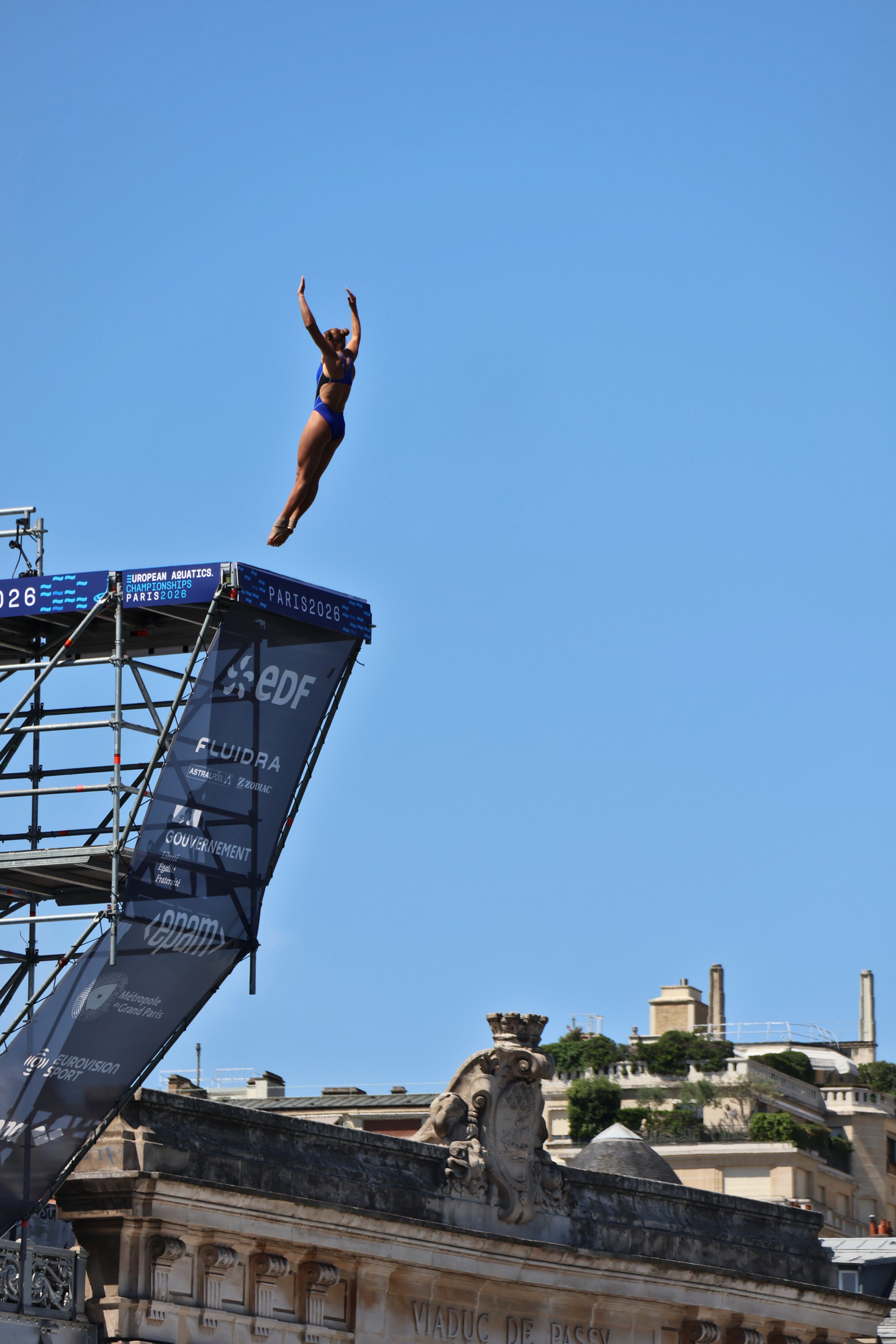
Nelli Chukanivska.

Rank	Diver	Nationality	R1	R2	R3	R4	Total
1st place, gold medalist(s)	Nelli Chukanivska	Ukraine	61.10	91.20	74.40	98.00	324.70
2nd place, silver medalist(s)	Elisa Cosetti	Italy	58.50	83.30	68.00	87.40	297.20
3rd place, bronze medalist(s)	Maike Halbisch	Germany	57.20	46.55	75.90	112.50	292.15
4	Morgane Herculano	Switzerland	54.60	84.00	61.20	81.70	281.50
5	Iris Schmidbauer	Germany	61.10	75.25	61.20	73.50	271.05
6	Madeleine Bayon	France	57.20	66.00	69.70	51.30	244.20
7	Ginni van Katwijk	Netherlands	44.20	30.75	71.40	46.80	193.15
8	Annika Bornebusch	Denmark	44.20	28.90	47.85	40.70	161.65
