= High diving at the 2025 World Aquatics Championships =

- Host city: Singapore
- Date(s): 24–27 July
- Venue(s): Sentosa Island
- Events: 2

High diving at the 2025 World Aquatics Championships was held from 24 to 27 July 2025 at Sentosa Island in Singapore.

== Schedule ==
Two events were held.

All times are local (UTC+8).

Date	Time	Event
24 July 2025	11:00	Women Rounds 1–2
24 July 2025	14:00	Men Rounds 1–2
25 July 2025	11:00	Women Rounds 3–4
25 July 2025	14:00	Men Rounds 3–4
26 July 2025	11:00	Women Round 5
26 July 2025	12:00	Women Round 6
27 July 2025	11:00	Men Round 5
27 July 2025	12:00	Men Round 6

== Medal summary ==
=== Medal table ===
* Host nation (Singapore)

Rank	Nation	Gold	Silver	Bronze	Total
1	United States	1	0	1	2
2	Australia	1	0	0	1
3	Canada	0	1	0	1
3	Spain	0	1	0	1
5	Romania	0	0	1	1
Totals (5 entries)		2	2	2	6

Source: Worldaquatics

=== Medal events ===
Event	Gold		Silver		Bronze	
Men	James Lichtenstein; United States	428.90	Carlos Gimeno; Spain	425.30	Constantin Popovici; Romania	408.70
Women	Rhiannan Iffland; Australia	359.25	Simone Leathead; Canada	314.50	Maya Kelly; United States	310.00
