= Simone Leathead =

Canadian high diver (born 2003)

Personal information
- Born: April 22, 2003 (age 23) Montréal, Quebec, Canada
- Height: 1.57 m (5 ft 2 in)
- Weight: 54 kg (119 lb)

Sport
- Country: Canada
- Sport: High diving
- Coached by: Stéphane Lapointe
Medal record
World Championships
Silver medal – second place	2025 Singapore	Women

Simone Leathead (born April 22, 2003) is a Canadian high diver. She won silver at the 2025 World Aquatics Championships and second at the 2024 World Aquatics High Diving World Cup event in Bahrain. She won bronze at the 2024 Red Bull Cliff Diving World Series. She placed fourth in high diving at the 2023 World Aquatics Championship.

== Early life ==
Leathead was born on April 22, 2003 in Montreal, Quebec, Quebec.

== Career ==
Leathead initially trained in diving at 3m and 10m. She began high diving in February 2022. In December of that year, she competed at the first ever junior high diving championship at the 2022 FINA World Junior Diving Championships in Montreal. She won gold in the 15m. Leathead competed in high diving at the 2023 World Aquatics Championship and placed fourth overall with 312.40 points. She placed fifth at the Canamex High Diving Challenge in Fort Lauderdale, Florida in December 2023.

She made her Red Bull Cliff Diving debut in as a wildcard Paris in June 2023, finishing in sixth place with 285.6 points. She also competed at the Japan and Auckland events in the 2023 Red Bull Cliff Diving World Series. She placed 10th overall in the series with 183 points, and earning a spot as a permanent diver on the 2024 series. Leathead placed seventh in the women's 20-metre at the 2024 World Aquatics Championships. She placed third at the first stop on the 2024 Red Bull Cliff Diving World Series in Athens, with 319.1 points. Leathead came third overall in the series after winning silver at the final stop in Sydney.

Leathead placed second at the first World Aquatics High Diving World Cup event of 2024 in Bahrain. Before the final dive, she was in seventh place. She dove a back triple with one twist and took the lead with 307.80 points, only being surpassed by 16.40 points by fellow Canadian, Molly Carlson.

In July 2025, Leathead won the silver medal in the women's high diving event at the 2025 World Aquatics Championships in Singapore.
