= Abbey of San Vito Martire =

Abbey in southern Italy

Coordinates: 41.0133°N 17.1923°E

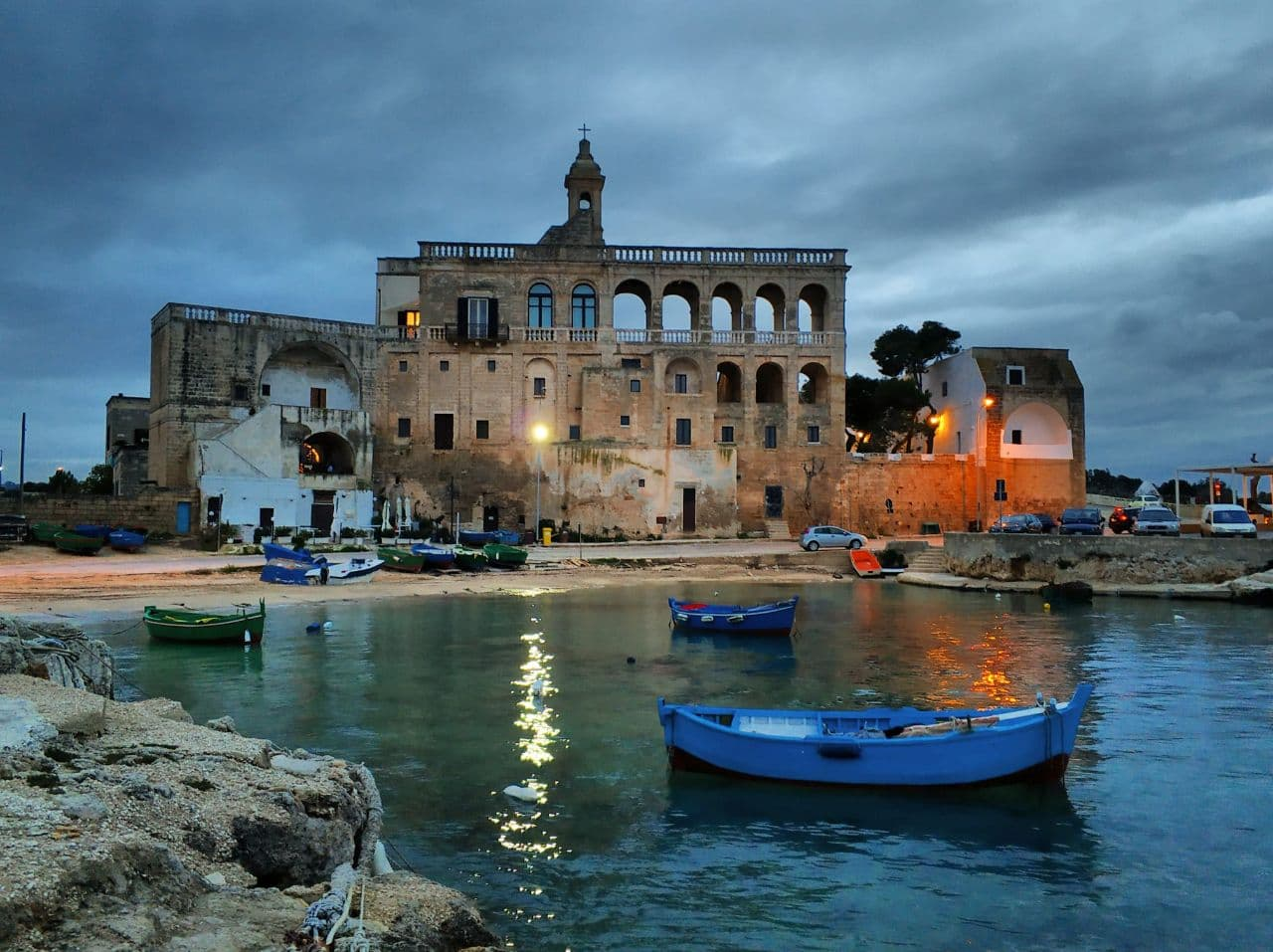

The Abbey of San Vito Martire is a cultural attraction located in Apulia, Southern Italy, three miles north of Polignano a Mare.

== History ==
An example of the combination of both Baroque and Romanesque architecture, the holy building had a troubled history. The church, of Benedictine foundation, was designed during the 10th century and became home of the Friars Minors Conventual from the 16th century onwards. Soon after, in the period that goes from 1600 to 1700, artistic and structural changes were made according to that era's dominant style. In 1866, the Abbey was acquired by Marchesi La Greca and the descendants of the family are still the owners today.

== The legend ==
According to the legend, the Princess of Salerno, Florenza, was drowning in the Sele River in Campania in 801, but she managed to escape from death as a result of the intervention of St. Vito. By that time, he asked her to transfer his body, together with those of his tutors Modesto and Crescentia, to a place called Marianus, in the Castrum Polymnianense. Some local farms were bought by the princess as a gift for the Benedictine monks, who then became the keepers of the Saint's remains. This episode would have led the Abbey to its local recognition.

== The structure ==
The Abbey has an irregular quadrangular plan, with a portico on the main façade. It houses a staircase dating back to the seventeenth century, which leads to the panoramic loggia. Here are discernible traces of the Baroque. The church, on the other hand, was built on the ruins of an ancient Roman tower, presents itself in a Romanesque style, and has three main aisles. The transept is surmounted by a small circular dome, while its front door still has signs of the bullets that came from Turkish attacks. The interior, which was restored during the 1960s, preserves a triptych of the Saints Vito, Modesto, and Crescenza. The structure is open on Sundays during the hours of the liturgy.

== Torre di San Vito ==
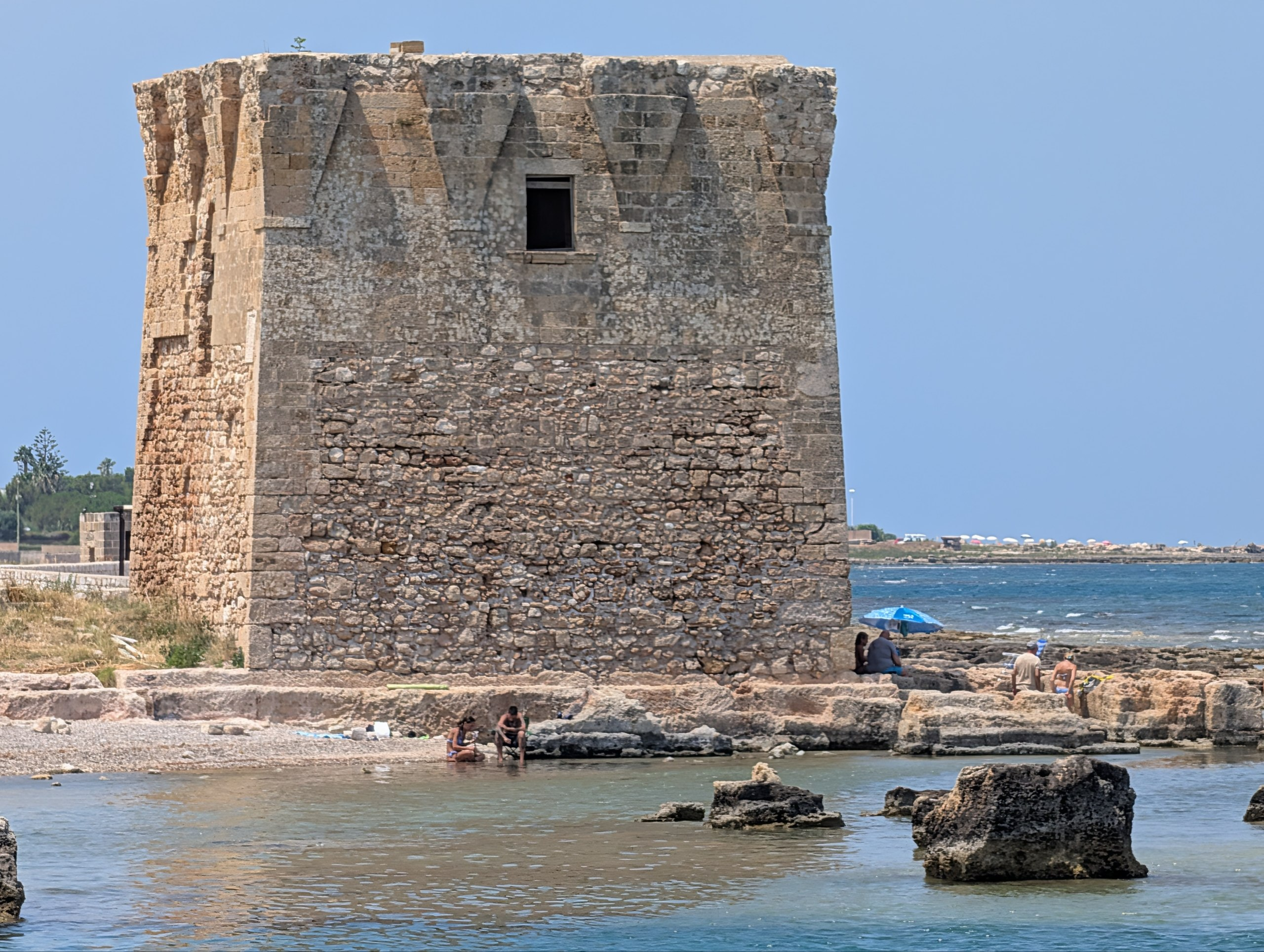
Torre di San Vito, a coastal watchtower in the San Vito locality of Polignano a Mare, Metropolitan City of Bari, Apulia, Italy.

Near the abbey stands the Torre di San Vito, a coastal watchtower at Cala Porto San Vito in the San Vito locality of Polignano a Mare. Official tourism material states that the monks had the tower erected in the 17th century to defend the abbey as the village developed. The Italian national heritage catalog lists it as Torre costiera S. Vito, records two construction hypotheses, one in the 16th century and another between 1695 and 1702, and describes it as a square-plan masonry tower in limestone and tuff with a barrel-vaulted interior and a flat terrace roof. The same heritage record identifies the structure as a historic watchtower and notes that it has been protected under Italian cultural heritage law since 13 May 1983.
