= Alizée Costes =

French acrobatic gymnast

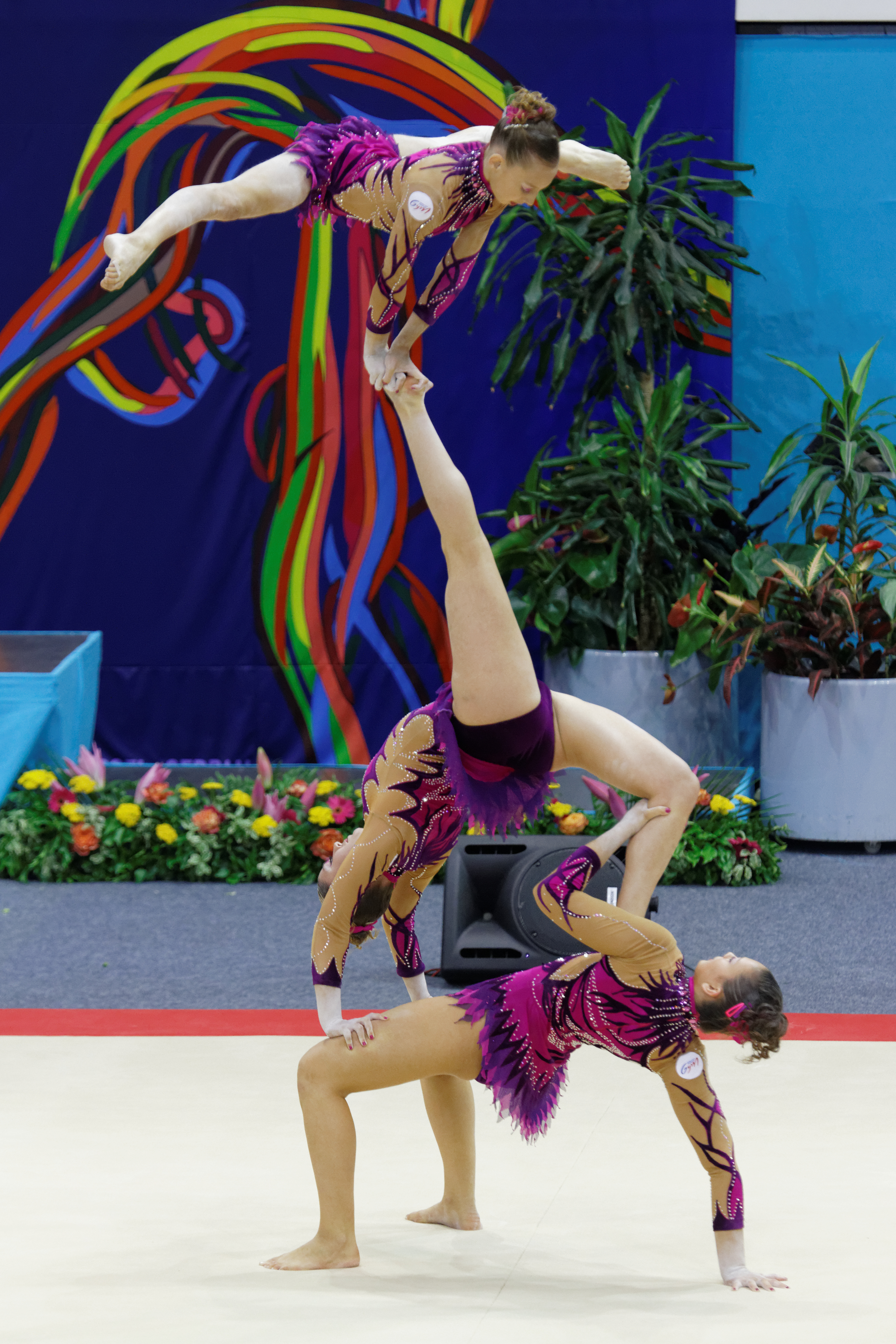
- Alizée Costes, Madeleine Bayon and Noémie Nadaud at the 2014 Acrobatic Gymnastics World Championships

Personal information
- Born: 9 August 1994 (age 32) Rennes

Gymnastics career
- Discipline: Acrobatic gymnastics
- Country represented: France
- Club: Cercle Paul Bert Rennes
- Head coaches: Eva Mauriceau, Malgo Bardy
- Former coach: Sandrine Bouvet
- Choreographer: Mélanie Avisse, Monique Hagard, Karine Lemetre

Alizée Costes (born 9 August 1994) is a French female acrobatic gymnast. With partners Madeleine Bayon and Noémie Nadaud, Costes achieved 7th in the 2014 Acrobatic Gymnastics World Championships.
