= Nelli Chukanivska =

Ukrainian high diver (born 2007)

Personal information
- Nationality: Ukrainian
- Born: 28 March 2007 (age 19)

Sport
- Country: Ukraine
- Sport: High diving
Medal record
Women's High diving
Representing Ukraine
European Championships
| Gold medal – first place | 2026 Paris | Women |
World Junior Championships
| Gold medal – first place | 2022 Montréal | 12 m platform |

Nelli Chukanivska (Ukrainian: Неллі Чуканівська, born 28 March 2007) is a Ukrainian high diver.

== Career ==
In August 2026, Chukanivska made her European Championships at the 2026 European Aquatics Championships. She won a gold medal in high diving with a score of 324.70 points, finishing 27.50 points ahead of Italy's Elisa Cosetti. This marked Ukraine's first medal in high diving at the European Championships.
