= 2024 World Aquatics Junior Open Water Swimming Championships =

International swimming competition

- Host city: Alghero, Italy
- Date: 5–8 September
- Teams: 35
- Events: 10

2024 World Aquatics Junior Open Water Swimming Championships was held from 5 to 8 September 2024 at the Alghero, Italy. The United States earned the most medals, winning a total of six.

== Results ==
=== Men ===
Event	Gold		Silver		Bronze	
3 km knockout sprint	Kaito Tsujimori; Japan	5:54.10	Vasileios Kakoulakis; Greece	5:54.50	Sacha Velly; France	5:54.60
5 km	Jonas Lieschke; Germany	59:42.10	Balint Kreisz; Hungary	59:55.40	Konstantinos Chourdakis; Greece	59:57.80
7.5 km	Emir Batur Albayrak; Turkey	1:18:34.30	Davide Grossi; Italy	1:18:34.50	Atakan Ercan; Turkey	1:18:39.00
10 km	Sacha Velly; France	1:59:44.20	Piotr Wozniak; Poland	2:00:13.60	Vincenzo Caso; Italy	2:00:15.80

=== Women ===
Event	Gold		Silver		Bronze	
3 km knockout sprint	Claire Weinstein; United States	5:50.80	Brinkleigh Hansen; United States	6:00.00	Clemence Coccordano; France	6:02.00
5 km	Brinkleigh Hansen; United States	1:03:05.30	Anna Bartalos; Hungary	1:03:09.50	Mahila Spennato; Italy	1:03:14.80
7.5 km	Claire Weinstein; United States	1:25:43.30	Clara Martinez De Salinas Pena; Spain	1:25:46.00	Napsugar Nagy; Hungary	1:25:49.60
10 km	Claire Stuhlmacher; United States	2:09:15.90	Chiara Sanzullo; Italy	2:09:16.20	Georgia Makri; Greece	2:09:16.60

=== Mixed ===
Event	Gold		Silver		Bronze	
4 × 1500 m	France; Clemence Coccordano; Valentine Leclercq; Emile Vincent; Sacha Velly	1:11:45.70	United States; Claire Stuhlmacher; Ryan Erisman; Claire Weinstein; Luke Ellis	1:11:45.90	Spain; Noa Martin; Clara Martinez De Salinas Pena; Mateo Garcia Castro; Cristoba Vargas Trujillo	1:11:46.00
4 × 1500 m (14–16)	Hungary; Napsugar Nagy; Anna Bartalos; Marton Huszti; Mate Karpati	1:13:23.40	Germany; Sydney Savannah Ferch; Laura Marie Blumenthal Haz; Moritz Paul Erkmann; Jonas Lieschke	1:13:54.30	Italy; Ginevra Bagaglini; Mahila Spennato; Gabriele Aloisi; Gaetano Tammaro	1:14:40.80

== Medal table ==
* Host nation (Italy)

Rank	Nation	Gold	Silver	Bronze	Total
1	United States	4	2	0	6
2	France	2	0	2	4
3	Hungary	1	2	1	4
4	Germany	1	1	0	2
5	Turkey	1	0	1	2
6	Japan	1	0	0	1
7	Italy*	0	2	3	5
8	Greece	0	1	2	3
9	Spain	0	1	1	2
10	Poland	0	1	0	1
Totals (10 entries)		10	10	10	30
