= High diving at the 2022 European Aquatics Championships – Women =

Women at the 2022 European Aquatics Championships
- Venue: Foro Italico
- Dates: 18, 19 August
- Competitors: 8 from 6 nations
- Winning points: 309.30

Medalists
gold medal	Iris Schmidbauer	Germany
silver medal	Antonina Vyshyvanova	Ukraine
bronze medal	Elisa Cosetti	Italy

The Women competition of the high diving events at the 2022 European Aquatics Championships was held on 18 and 19 August 2022.

It marked the first time a women's high diving event was conducted at a LEN European Aquatics Championships. Competition was contested from a 20 metre platform.

== Results ==
The first two rounds were held on 18 August at 18:00. The last two rounds were started on 19 August at 18:00.

Rank	Diver	Nationality	Round 1	Round 2	Round 3	Round 4	Total
1st place, gold medalist(s)	Iris Schmidbauer	Germany	62.40	90.30	66.30	90.30	309.30
2nd place, silver medalist(s)	Antonina Vyshyvanova	Ukraine	52.00	74.80	74.25	94.35	295.40
3rd place, bronze medalist(s)	Elisa Cosetti	Italy	62.40	79.90	85.00	57.00	284.30
4	Anna Bader	Germany	59.80	98.00	61.20	62.90	281.90
5	Ginni van Katwijk	Netherlands	40.30	52.70	66.30	57.40	216.70
6	Annika Bornebusch	Denmark	45.50	54.00	35.00	31.50	166.00
7	Celia Fernández	Spain	27.30	40.80	58.90	31.50	158.50
8	Veronica Papa	Italy	32.50	31.05	52.20	36.45	150.40
