= Noémie Nadaud =

French acrobatic gymnast

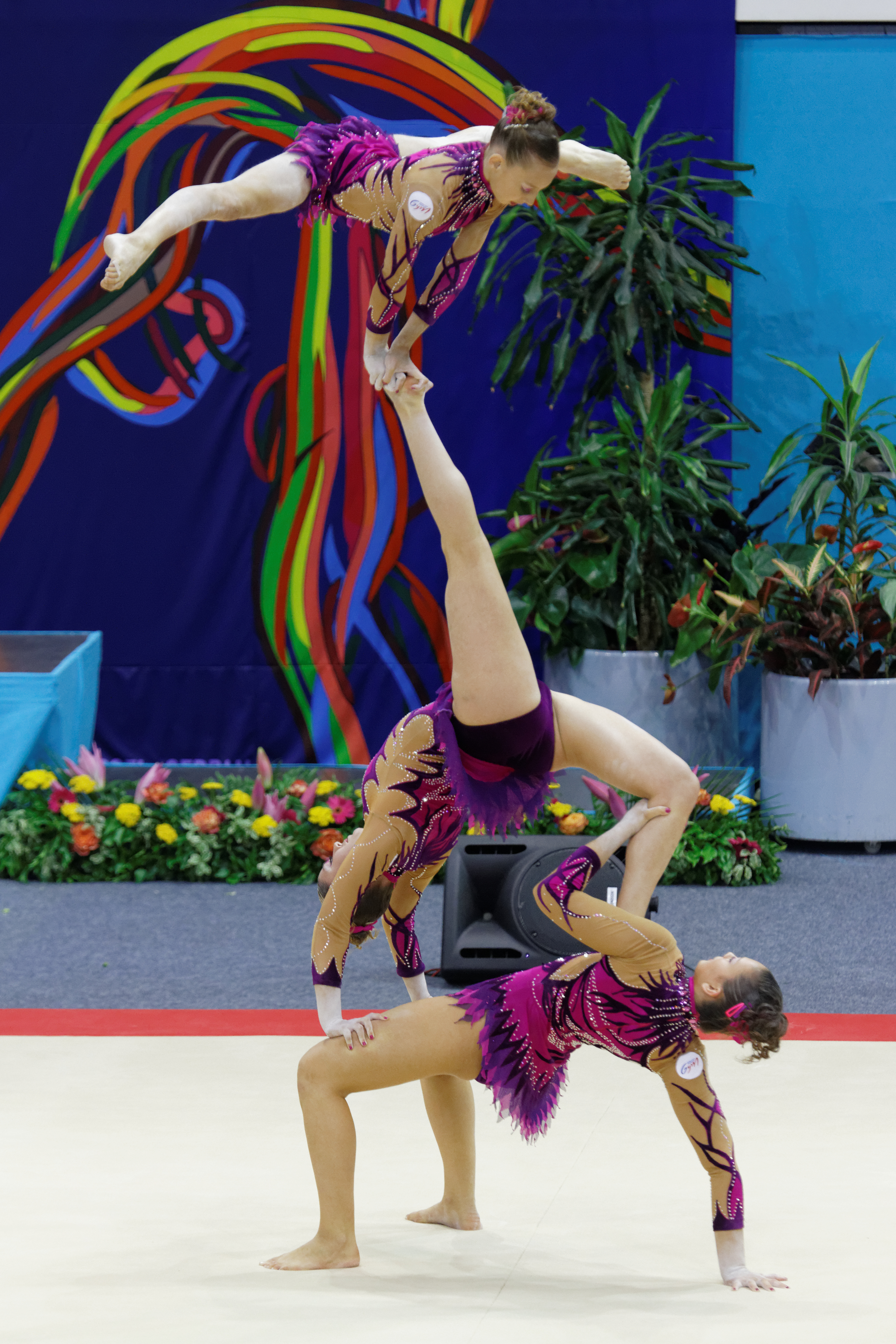
- Noémie Nadaud, Madeleine Bayon and Alizée Costes at the 2014 Acrobatic Gymnastics World Championships

Personal information
- Born: 18 April 1995 (age 31) Tahiti

Gymnastics career
- Discipline: Acrobatic gymnastics
- Country represented: France
- Club: OAJLP Antibes
- Head coaches: Eva Mauriceau, Margot Bardy
- Choreographer: Mélanie Avisse, Monique Hagard, Karine Lemêtre

Noémie Nadaud (born 18 April 1995) is a French female acrobatic gymnast. With partners Alizée Costes and Madeleine Bayon, Nadaud achieved 7th in the 2014 Acrobatic Gymnastics World Championships.
