= Jessica Macaulay =

British high diver

Personal information
- Nationality: British
- Born: 9 November 1992 (age 34) Great Yarmouth, England, United Kingdom
- Height: 1.78 m (5 ft 10 in)
- Weight: 63 kg (139 lb)

Sport
- Country: Great Britain, Canada
- Sport: High diving
- University team: Texas A&M Aggies
Medal record
World Championships
Representing Great Britain
Bronze medal – third place	2019 Gwangju	Women
Representing Canada
Bronze medal – third place	2023 Fukuoka	Women
Bronze medal – third place	2024 Doha	Women

Jessica Macaulay (born 9 November 1992) is a British and Canadian high diver. She placed second in the women's competition at two Red Bull Cliff Diving World Series and has won two bronze medals in high diving at the World Aquatics Championships.

== Early life ==
Macauly was born in Great Yarmouth, England. Her family relocated to Canada, where her father is from, when she was six weeks old. She lived in Canada for two years, then her family moved to Malaysia. After seven years in Malaysia, they moved to Texas. She did traditional diving from ages nine to twenty-one.

== Career ==
Macaulay competed for the Texas A&M Aggies from 2010 to 2014. She first tried high-diving in 2014.

She competed at the 2019 World Aquatics Championships, winning a bronze medal in high-diving for Great Britain. She finished in second place overall in the 2019 Red Bull Cliff Diving World Series, competing for Britain. Macaulay placed second overall in the 2021 Red Bull Cliff Diving World Series, competing for Canada. She had a podium finish in every event except one that season.

In the movie Tenet, she played as a stunt double of the character Kat.

Macaulay won the bronze medal in high-diving at the World Aquatics Championships in Fukuoka, Japan, competing for Canada. She retired from the cliff diving circuit in January 2024, following her final dives in the 2023 Red Bull Cliff Diving World Series. She finished third in the season's final event in New Zealand, marking her 13th podium in 31 career events. She placed sixth overall in the series with 468 points. Macaulay won a bronze medal in the women's 20-metre at the 2024 World Aquatics Championships.

== Personal life ==
In early 2021, she moved to Montreal and began competing for Canada.
