= Brinkleigh Hansen =

American swimmer (born 2009)

Personal information
- Full name: Brinkleigh Hansen
- National team: United States
- Born: December 16, 2009 (age 16)

Sport
- Sport: Swimming
- Strokes: Freestyle, Open Water
- Club: Saint Petersburg Aquatics
Medal record
Women's swimming
Representing the United States
World Junior Championships
Silver medal – second place	2025 Otopeni	4×200 m freestyle
World Junior Open Water Championships
Gold medal – first place	2024 Alghero	5 km
Silver medal – second place	2024 Alghero	3 km knockout sprint

Brinkleigh Hansen (born December 16, 2009) is an American swimmer who specializes in open water events. At the 2024 World Aquatics Junior Open Water Swimming Championships, Hansen won the 5 km open water event and won silver in the 3 km knockout sprint.

On April 8, 2025, Hansen won her first US National Title in the 10 km open water event which qualified her for the 2025 World Aquatics Championships.

Hansen competed at the 2025 World Aquatics Championships in the 10 km, 5 km, and 3 km knockout sprint events. Hansen was the youngest member of Team USA at the 2025 World Aquatics Championships.

== Medals ==
At the 2024 World Aquatics Junior Open Water Swimming Championships, Hansen won the 5 km open water event and won silver in the 3 km knockout sprint.
