= Kaylea Arnett =

American diver (born 1993)

Personal information
- Born: April 19, 1993 (age 33) Texas, U.S.

Sport
- Country: USA
- Sport: Diving, High diving
Medal record
World Cup
Bronze medal – third place	2024 Bahrain	Women

Kaylea Arnett is an American Chickasaw diver. She has competed in synchronized diving, individual platform and springboard diving, and high diving. Arnett has also performed with Cirque du Soleil.

== Early life and education ==
Arnett is Chickasaw. She was born in Texas and grew up on the Chickasaw reservation in Oklahoma. She attended Spring ISD Virtual School and later Virginia Tech on an athletic scholarship. While at Virginia Tech, she studied abroad in Japan. She graduated with a philosophy major and a minor in Japanese.

== Career ==
Arnett began diving in 2001, training at the Diving Regional Training Center at Oklahoma City Community College. At age 10 she qualified for the Junior Pan-American Games in Belem, Brazil, and won bronze medals in the 1-meter and platform competition. She won two gold medals and a bronze in the 2007 Junior Pan-American Championships as well as two bronze medals at the 2005 Junior Pan-American Championships.

In 2008, Arnett came second in the 14-15 girls 1-meter springboard at the Speedo Junior National Diving Championships. She and Michelle Cabassol won the synchronized platform at the Speedo USA Diving Spring National Championships in 2009. They came third in the women's synchronized 10-metre on the FINA Grand Prix diving circuit that same year. Arnett and Cabassol won gold in the Synchronized Women Platform event at the USA Diving National Championships in 2013.

In 2014, she set the record Taishoff pool record on the 1-meter board with a score of 335.85. This record was broken in 2023.

She performed at The House of Dancing Water in Macau, China for about five years and then, in 2023, she joined the cast of O at the Bellagio.

Arnett placed fourth in the women's 20-meter at the 2024 World Aquatics Championships. Arnett placed second at the Boston stop on the 2024 Red Bull Cliff Diving World Series and at the event in Polignano a Mare, Italy. She placed third at the Montreal event and 5th overall in the series.

After the first three rounds of diving at the first World Aquatics High Diving World Cup event of 2024 in Bahrain, Arnett was in second place overall. As divers competed in the reverse order of their third round standings for the final round, Arnett needed 95.80 to take the lead from Canadian Molly Carlson. Her inward triple with ½ twist pike had a 4.0 degree of difficulty and earned her 78.00 points for third place behind Calrson and Simone Leathead.
