= Molly Carlson =

Canadian high diver (born 1998)

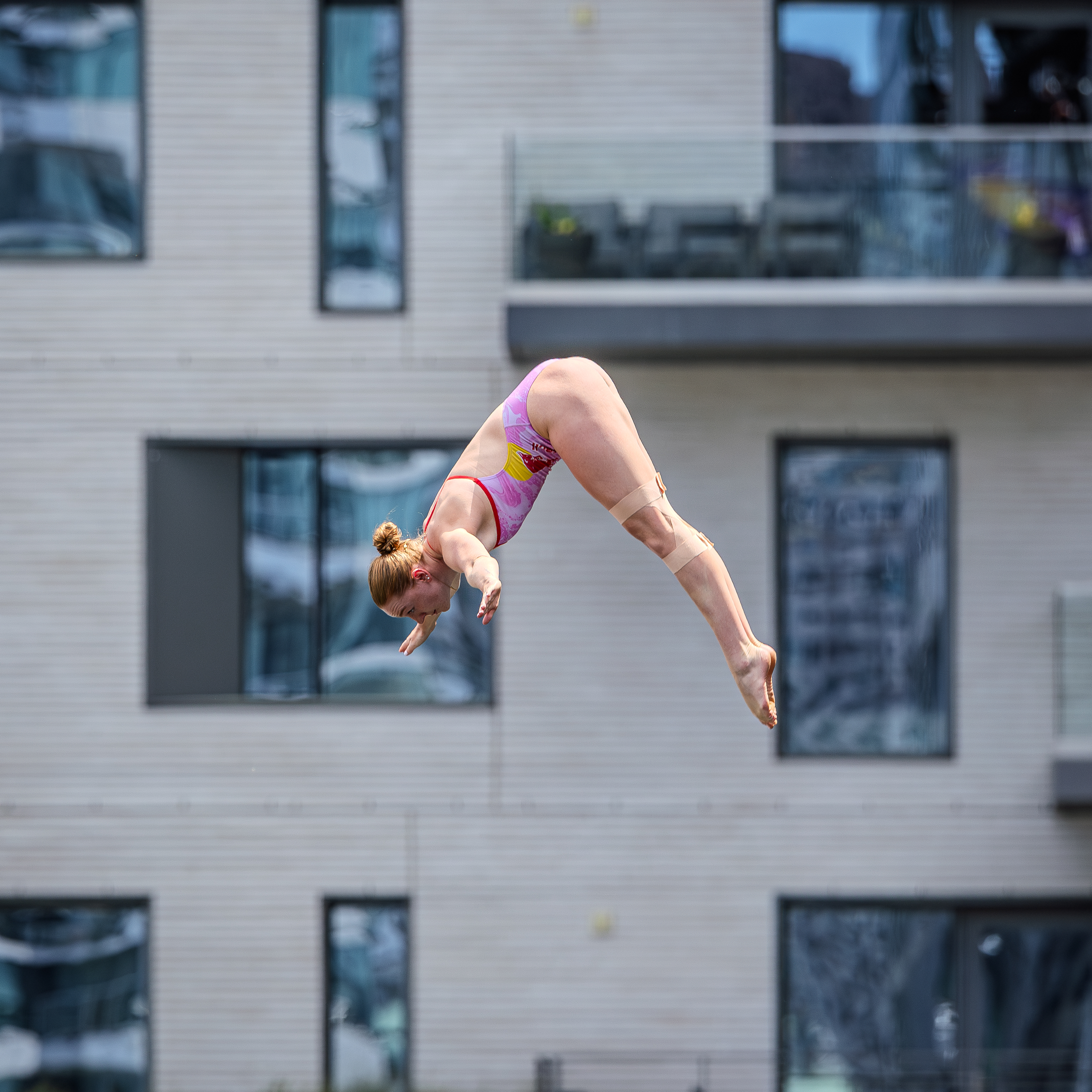
- Carlson in 2024

Personal information
- Nationality: Canadian
- Born: September 23, 1998 (age 28) Fort Frances, Ontario, Canada
- Education: Florida State University (BA, 2020); Yorkville University (MA, current)
- Height: 1.73 m (5 ft 8 in)
- Website: www.mollycarlsonofficial.com

Sport
- Country: Canada
- Sport: High diving
- University team: Florida State Seminoles
Medal record
World Cup
Gold medal – first place	2024 Bahrain	Women
World Championships
Silver medal – second place	2023 Fukuoka	Women
Silver medal – second place	2024 Doha	Women

Molly Carlson (born September 23, 1998) is a Canadian diver who currently competes in high diving. She is a member of Canada's senior national high diving team and placed second at the 2022, 2023, and 2024 Red Bull Cliff Diving World Series.

Carlson is a former competitive standard diver and competed at the 2014 Youth Olympic Games, before switching to high diving after being unsuccessful in making Canada's 2016 Olympic team.

Carlson is also a social media personality and uploads videos of herself diving on TikTok and YouTube. She founded the online support community #BraveGang in her capacity as a mental heath advocate.

== Early life and education ==
Carlson was born in Fort Frances, Ontario and lived there for the first year of her life. She grew up in Thunder Bay. She has an older sister, Megan. Her mother, Kathleen Trivers, had both her children as a teenager. Trivers separated from Carlson's father, Jason, when Carlson was a toddler.

Carlson did gymnastics as a small child and began diving in 2008 at age nine. She began training with the Thunder Bay Diving Club in 2008. During her final year of high school, Carlson moved from Thunder Bay to Toronto to focus on diving and training to make the 2016 Olympic team. During this time, Carlson had binge eating disorder and body dysmorphia.

She began attending Florida State University in 2016 and graduated in 2020 with a Bachelor of Arts in psychology. After graduation, Carlson relocated to Canada. She is currently enrolled in a Masters of Arts in counselling psychology at Yorkville University.

== Career ==
=== Junior and university (2013–2020) ===
At age 10, Carlson qualified for the 2009 Pan Am Junior Games. In standard competitive diving, competing on the springboard and platform, Carlson was a seven-time national junior champion and a two-time Junior Pan-American champion (2013 and 2015). Carlson competed at the Nanjing 2014 Youth Olympics in the three-meter competition. Carlson won gold at the 2013 and 2014 International Youth Diving Meets. In 2014 and 2016, she was a Junior World Championship Finalist. She moved to Toronto for her grade twelve year so she could train at the Toronto Pan Am Sports Centre with the national team. Carlson tried to make Canada's 2016 Olympic diving team, but placed fourth at the Olympic trials.

From 2017 to 2020, Carlson competed for the Florida State Seminoles. She was an NCAA All-American in 2017, 2019, and 2020 and the ACC MVP/Diver of the Year in 2017, 2019, and 2020. In 2019, Carlson polled her Instagram followers to ask if she should compete in the Red Bull Cliff Diving World Series. They voted overwhelmingly yes.

=== High diving (2020–present) ===
After graduation, Carlson transitioned to cliff diving. She began high diving after a series of wrist injuries made head-first entries difficult. Carlson competed in the 2021 Red Bull Cliff Diving World Series. She entered as a wild card for Canada. At her first cliff diving event in France, Carlson placed second. She finished third overall in the series.

In the 2022 Red Bull Cliff Diving World Series, Carlson won the Boston event. For her final dive, Carlson was awarded the season's first 10. At 23, she was the youngest person to win an event at a Red Bull Cliff Diving World Series. Her boyfriend, British diver Aidan Heslop, broke the record later that day, winning the men's event at age 20. Carlson also placed second at the Paris event and the event at Lake Uri in Sisikon, Switzerland. Carlson ultimately placed second overall in the series.

Carlson trains at the Olympic Pool in Montreal, the only training facility in the world with an indoor 20-metre platform. She is coached by Stéphane Lapointe. She won the 2022 AthletesCAN True Sport Award. In 2023, she won the first Canadian Senior High Diving title, scoring 382.30, and the World Aquatics High Diving title, scoring 374.00 points over her four dives. In July 2023, Carlson won the silver medal in high-diving at the World Aquatics Championships in Fukuoka, Japan. She scored 322.80 points, behind gold-medalist Rhiannan Iffland's 357.40.

Carlson chronicles her diving career on social media. On social media, she has founded the #BraveGang, through which she shares her own mental health journey and struggles in addition to providing a community for others to discuss their mental health. As of February 2026 she has 3.9 million followers on TikTok and 2.88 million subscribers on YouTube.

Carlson competed in the 2023 Red Bull Cliff Diving World Series. She placed second at the first four events of the series and won the Mostar event. She placed second overall in the series with 990 points after a fourth-place finish at the final event in Auckland. Her top-four finish earned her a spot in the 2024 series. Carlson won a silver medal in the women's 20-metre at the 2024 World Aquatics Championships.

She placed first at the first stop on the 2024 Red Bull Cliff Diving World Series in Athens, with 323.85 points, just ahead of Rhiannan Iffland's 323.75 points. Carlson placed third at the second stop in the 2024 series in Boston, as well as the third stop in Polignano a Mare, Italy and the fourth stop in Northern Ireland. Carlson placed first at the fifth stop in Montreal, the first time the Red Bull Cliff Diving World Series had ever been in Canada. In Montreal, her best dive scored 103.60 points in part due to a perfect ten, the first ten in the women's competition in 2024. Carlson did not compete in the series' final event in Sydney, Australia due to a knee injury, but place second in the series overall for the third year in a row.

Carlson placed first at the first World Aquatics High Diving World Cup event of 2024 in Bahrain. Before the final dive, Carlson was in third place behind Kaylea Arnett and Rhiannan Iffland. She then dove her second-hardest dive of the contest, with a 3.8 degree of difficulty, bringing her score to 328.20 and placing her in the lead.

At the first stop of the 2025 Red Bull Cliff Diving World Series in El Nido, Carlson missed the approach on one of her dives. She placed fifth at the El Nido event. During a practice dive at the Polignano a Mare stop in the series, she slipped off the 22-metre platform, resulting in a foot injury that forced her to pull out of the Pogliano a Mare event. Carlson competed at the 2025 World Aquatics Championships in Singapore placing ninth.

At the first stop of the 2026 Red Bull Cliff Diving World Series in Bali in May 2026, Carlson scored 329.70 points and placed second.

She became the first woman to dive off an iceberg in June 2026, doing so off the coast of Newfoundland. This was documented in a thirty-minute documentary titled Red Bull Iceberg Dive.

== Personal life ==
Carlson has struggled with anxiety and body dysmorphia. She has also battled a binge eating disorder. Carlson is an advocate for mental health, telling CNN, “I have the biggest passion for mental health [...] I really want to public speak to athletes on how to prioritize your self-care and ask for help when you need it, because I never want anyone to go through the year of hell that I went through and to feel isolated and alone.”

In an interview with Red Bull, Carlson discussed her approach to overcoming fear. She discussed overcoming anxiety and credited the USA Volleyball player, Victoria Garrick, as a major influence. Carlson explained that watching Garrick overcome her own struggles to become her true self motivated her to do the same for her followers, stating, “She’s my biggest inspiration, for sure. I feel like we’ve gone through similar situations, and I definitely would love to meet her one day.”

She was named to Forbes' "30 Under 30 - Sports" list in 2025.

As of October 2026, she is engaged to fellow high diver Aidan Heslop
