= Maya Kelly =

American high diver (born 2006)

Personal information
- Nationality: American
- Born: November 7, 2006 (age 19) Stillwater, Minnesota, U.S.

Sport
- Country: United States
- Sport: High diving
Medal record
Women's high diving
Representing the United States
World Championships
Bronze medal – third place	2025 Singapore	Women

Maya Kelly (born November 7, 2006) is an American high diver. She won a bronze medal in high diving at the 2025 World Aquatics Championships.

== Career ==
Kelly competed at the 2025 World Aquatics Championships and won a bronze medal in the high diving event with a score of 310.00. At 18 years old, she became the youngest high diving World Aquatics Championships medalist. She became the first American female high diving medalist since 2015.
