= Eleanor Smart =

American high diver

Personal information
- Full name: Eleanor Townsend Smart
- Nickname: Ellie Smart
- Born: October 20, 1995 (age 30)
- Height: 1.68 m (5 ft 6 in)
- Weight: 56 kg (123 lb)

Sport
- Country: USA
- Sport: High diving
Medal record
FINA High Diving World Cup
Bronze medal – third place	2018 Abu Dhabi	Women

Eleanor Townsend Smart (born 1995), also known as Ellie Smart, is an American high diver. She placed third at the 2022 Red Bull Cliff Diving World Series.

== Early life and education ==
Smart was born on October 20, 1995. She grew up in Fairway, Kansas and began diving at age 5. Smart attended Shawnee Mission East High School in Prairie Village, Kansas before moving to Texas after her freshman year to more seriously pursue her athletic career in Texas.

She attended the University of California at Berkeley and graduated in 2016. After graduation, she pursued master's degree program in sports psychology.

== Career ==
Smart competed on the diving team for two seasons at the University of California at Berkeley.

She co-founded the Clean Cliffs Project with partner and fellow diver Owen Weymouth in 2017. In 2017, she made her Red Bull Cliff Diving World Series debut as a wildcard at the opening event in Inis Mór, Ireland. She scored 195.35 points, placing fifth. Smart won a bronze medal in high diving at the 2018 FINA High Diving World Cup, her world cup debut. 2019 was Smart's first season as a permanent diver on the Red Bull Cliff Diving World Series. She placed second at the event in Mostar, Bosnia and Herzegovina that season. In 2022, Smart placed second overall at the Red Bull World Series. She placed third in the Mostar event at the 2023 Red Bull Cliff Diving World Series, and fourth in the series overall.

Since 2021, she has been the CEO of High Dive Global, which she founded to promote and develop the sport of high diving.

Smart placed ninth in the women's 20-metre at the 2024 World Aquatics Championships. She was in fourth place after the first two rounds of diving. In 2024, she was appointed to the Board of Directors of the International Swimming Hall of Fame.

== Personal life ==
Smart splits her time between Fort Lauderdale and Prairie Village.
