= Xantheia Pennisi =

Australian high diver (born 1998)

Personal information
- Born: 26 November 1998 (age 27) Sunnybank, Queensland, Australia
- Height: 1.64 m (5 ft 5 in)
- Weight: 62 kg (137 lb)

Sport
- Country: Australia
- Sport: High diving

Xantheia Pennisi (born 26 November 1998) is an Australian high diver. She represented Australia at the 2019 World Aquatics Championships in Gwangju, South Korea, and she finished in sixth place in the women's high diving event. In 2019, she finished in ninth place in the 2019 Red Bull Cliff Diving World Series. She also competed in the 2023 Red Bull Cliff Diving World Series and 2025 Red Bull Cliff Diving World Series.

In 2023, she competed in the women's event at the World Aquatics Championships held in Fukuoka, Japan. She also competed in the women's event at the 2024 World Aquatics Championships held in Doha, Qatar.

Pennisi was born in Sunnybank, a suburb of Brisbane, Queensland. Her Filipina mother is from Tarlac.
