= Meili Carpenter =

American high diver (born 1987)

Personal information
- Born: December 8, 1987 (age 38) Boulder, Colorado
- Education: University at Buffalo

Sport
- Country: USA
- Sport: High diving
- University team: Buffalo Bulls

Meili Carpenter (born December 8, 1987) is an American high diver and former 1- and 3-meter diver for the Buffalo Bulls.

== Early life and education ==
Carpenter is from Boulder, Colorado. She attended the University at Buffalo and studied chemistry and psychology.

== Career ==
=== University (2006–10) ===
Carpenter competed for the University at Buffalo's Buffalo Bulls from 2006 to 2010. She holds the program record in the 1-meter and 3-meter diving events. In 2010, she won the 1-meter and 3-meter events at the Mid-American Conference (MAC) Championships. Carpenter was named University at Buffalo Female Athlete of the Year in 2010.

In 2023, Carpenter was inducted into the Dr. and Mrs. Edmond J. Gicewicz Family UB Athletics Hall of Fame at the University at Buffalo. She was the first diver in the Bulls' program history to win two diving gold medals at the same MAC Championship.

=== Early professional career and coaching (2010–2021) ===
Carpenter qualified for Olympic trials in diving in 2012, following second and ninth-place finishes in the one-meter and three-meter finals at the 2011 USA Diving Winter National Championships. She coached for Canisius College's diving program, beginning with their 2010–11 season.

=== High diving (2021–present) ===
Carpenter made her Red Bull Cliff Diving World Series debut as a wildcard diver at the Downpatrick Head event in Ireland in 2021. At the opening event of the 2022 World Series in Boston, she placed third, her first podium finish. Carpenter placed third on the fourth stop on the 2022 Red Bull Cliff Diving World Series in Oslo, Norway with a cumulative score of 314.10. With two podiums and a sixth-place finish overall in 2022, she qualified for a season regular spot at the 2023 World Series.

Carpenter placed fifth overall in women's high-diving at the 2023 World Aquatics Championships in Fukuoka, Japan, scoring 299.55 points over four dives. She finished sixth at the 2023 World Aquatics High Diving World Cup in Fort Lauderdale in the women's 20-meter competition.

Carpenter was the first person to dive at the Mostar event at the 2023 Red Bull Cliff Diving series, performing a back somersault for 58.5 points. Despite not making the podium, she placed fifth overall in the series. At the 2024 Red Bull Cliff Diving World Series, Carpenter placed fourth at the second stop in Boston. She placed fourth overall in the series.
