= Ginni van Katwijk =

Dutch high diver (born 1985)

Personal information
- Born: 5 March 1985 (age 41) Rotterdam, Netherlands

Sport
- Sport: High diving
- University team: University of Houston Cougars

Ginni van Katwijk (born 5 March 1985) is a Dutch high diver.

== Career ==
Van Katwijk dove at the University of Houston. She began diving as a performer on Royal Caribbean Cruise Lines after graduation.

She made her Red Bull Cliff Diving World Series debut in Saint-Raphaël, France in 2021, becoming the first diver from the Netherlands, as well as the first married couple, with husband Matt Cooper, to compete at the Red Bull Cliff Diving World Series. Van Katwijk placed fifth in high diving at the 2022 European Aquatics Championships.

In 2023, Cooper and van Katwijk became the first married couple to compete at the World Aquatics High Diving World Cup. She placed eleventh, with 232.70 points, at the World High Diving Championship in Fukuoka, Japan. Van Katwijk placed fourteenth at the women's 20-metre at the 2024 World Aquatics Championships in Doha. She placed second at the Northern Ireland event at the 2024 Red Bull Cliff Diving World Series, her first ever podium finish at a Red Bull event.

== Personal life ==
Van Katwijk is married to Matt Cooper (born 4 March 1989), an American high diver. They met while both were competing in university-level diving in Texas, with van Katwijk diving for the University of Houston, and Cooper for the University of Texas at Austin. Cooper proposed in 2016, and the couple married two years later.
