= Polignano a Mare =

Town in Apulia, Italy

- Comune
- Comune di Polignano a Mare
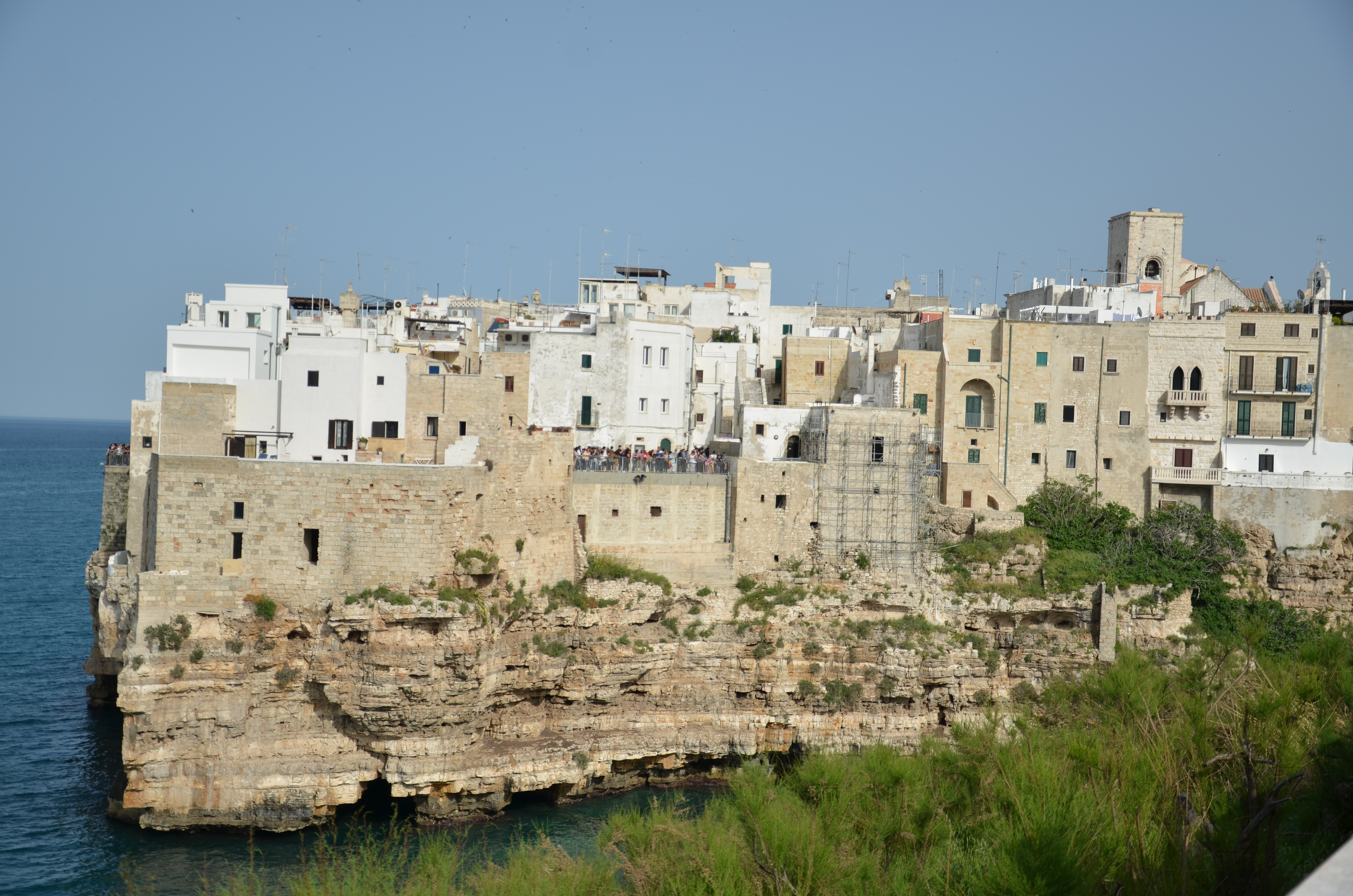
- View of Polignano a Mare

- Coat of arms

- Location within Italy Location within Apulia
- Coordinates: 41°00′N 17°13′E
- Country: Italy
- Region: Apulia
- Metropolitan city: Bari (BA)
- Frazioni: Casello Cavuzzi, Chiesa Nuova, San Vito and a part of Triggianello

Government
  - Mayor: Vito Carrieri

Area
  - Total: 67 km^{2} (26 sq mi)
- Elevation: 24 m (79 ft)

Population (1 January 2021)
  - Total: 17,491
  - Density: 260/km^{2} (680/sq mi)
- Demonym: Polignanesi
- Time zone: UTC+1 (CET)
  - Summer (DST): UTC+2 (CEST)
- Postal code: 70044
- Dialing code: 080
- Patron saint: St. Vitus
- Saint day: June 15
- Website: Official website

Polignano a Mare (Italian: [poliɲˈɲaːno a mˈmaːre]; Barese: Peghegnéne [pəɡəɲˈɲeːnə]) is a town and municipality (Italian: comune) in the Metropolitan City of Bari, Apulia, southern Italy, located on the Adriatic Sea. The local economy mostly depends on tourism, agriculture and fishing.

== History ==
The area has been settled since prehistoric times, evidenced by archaeological excavations in the locality of Santa Barbara. It is believed to be the site of the ancient Greek city of Neapolis of Apulia. Nowadays, some historians suggest that this latter was one of the two colonies founded during the 4th century BC by Dionysius II of Syracuse; other sources, instead, claim Julius Caesar as the father of Polignano a Mare, which might have been a central hub along the well-known Via Traiana. Thanks to its strategic position on the Adriatic Sea, it soon became a trade centre, at least until the introduction of a Greek coin bearing the "NEAII" inscription.

The foreign dominations led the town to a greater development and recognition. The Byzantine Empire, in the 6th century, turned it into a municipal structure; subsequently, it was dominated by the Normans, who, during the 11th century made the local economy thrive by boosting the production of olive oil. The fortification of the suburb, on the other hand, has plainly to be attributed to the Angevins, who secured the protection of the land from potential threats including the Turkish army and different kinds of epidemics.

Under the Aragonese crown, Polignano reached its peak in both economic and cultural terms; this meant business men and merchants coming from different parts of the world meeting there soon afterwards.

== Landmarks ==
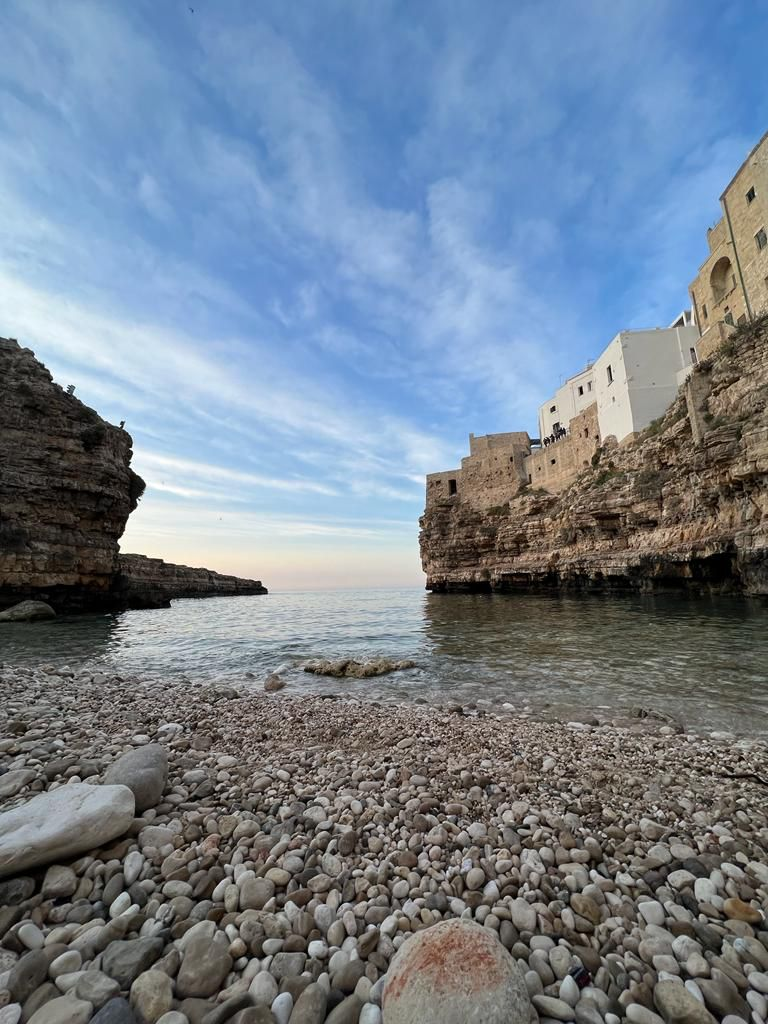
Lama Monachile

- Fondazione Museo "Pino Pascali"
- Palazzo dell'Orologio
- Abbey of San Vito Martire
- Church of Santa Maria Assunta
- The Grotta Palazzese Hotel
- Lama Monachile

== Transport ==
Polignano a Mare is served by Polignano a Mare railway station. Polignano a Mare is served by the following nearby airports:

- Bari Karol Wojtyła Airport
- Brindisi Airport

Polignano is also served by Cotrap and FS Sud Est buses.

== Twin towns ==
- San Miniato, Italy
- Forio, Italy
