= Rhiannan Iffland =

Australian high diver (born 1991)

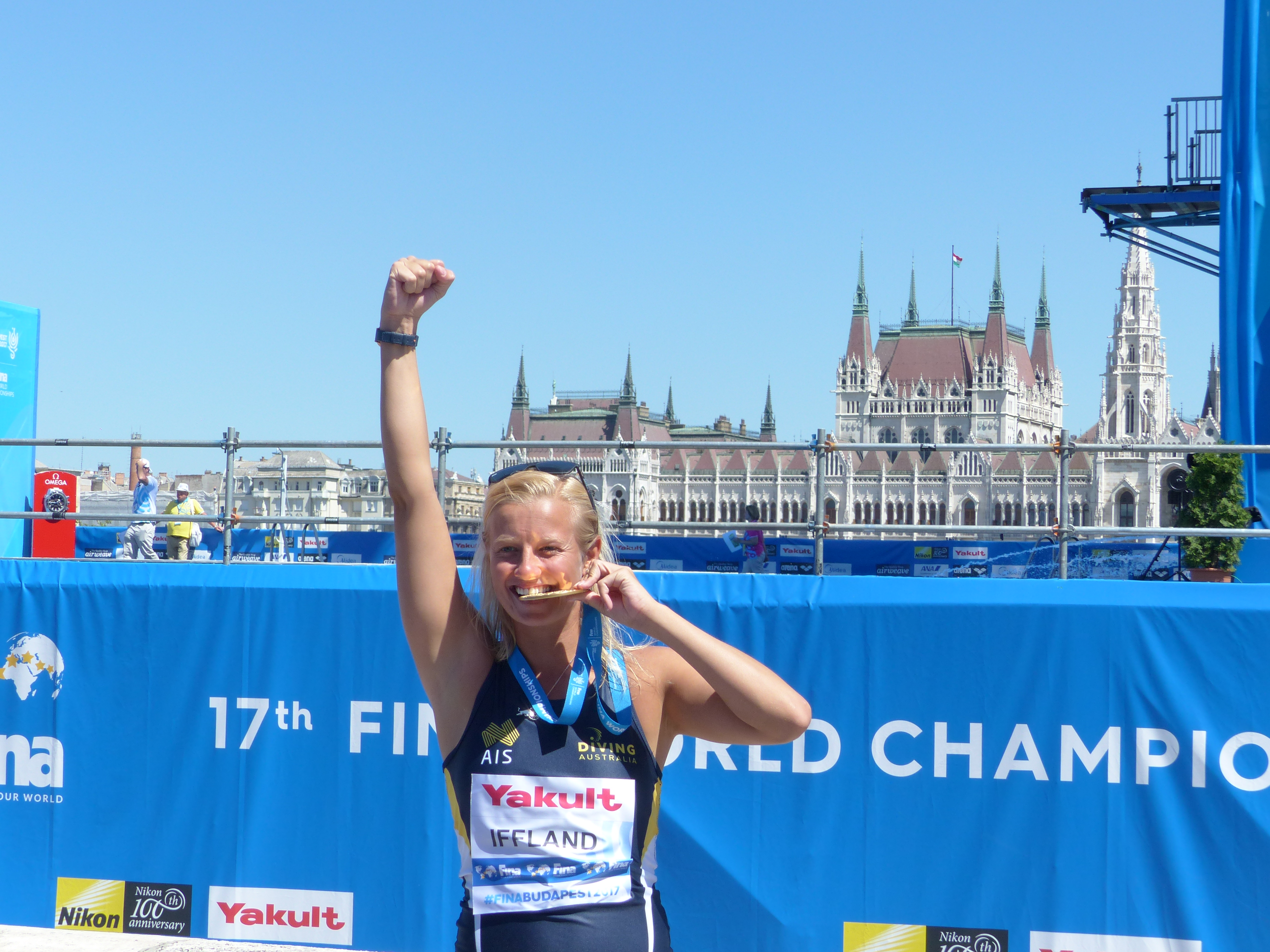
- Iffland after winning the gold medal at the 2017 World Aquatic Championships, Budapest

Personal information
- Nationality: Australian
- Born: 9 September 1991 (age 35) Newcastle, New South Wales, Australia
- Height: 1.67 m (5 ft 6 in)

Sport
- Country: Australia
- Sport: High diving, cliff diving
Medal record
Women's high diving
Representing Australia
World Championships
Gold medal – first place	2017 Budapest	Women
Gold medal – first place	2019 Gwangju	Women
Gold medal – first place	2023 Fukuoka	Women
Gold medal – first place	2024 Doha	Women
Gold medal – first place	2025 Singapore	Women

Rhiannan Iffland (born 9 September 1991) is an Australian high diver. She is a ten-time consecutive Red Bull Cliff Diving World Series champion (2016–2019, 2021–2026). She won her first championship in 2016 as a wildcard entrant in her debut year, the first-ever rookie to do so.

== Early life ==
Rhiannan Iffland was born in Newcastle, New South Wales, on 9 September 1991. She grew up in Nords Wharf and trained at Belmont High School in trampolining with former world champion Brett Austine. After using her skills in a move to diving, from 2001 to 2006 she trained at the Hunter United Diving Academy, then joined the NSW Institute of Sport, training with future Olympic medallists Melissa Wu and Matthew Mitcham.

Iffland was a medallist in 2007 at the CAMO International Canadian Championships, in 2008 at the Elite Junior Diving Championships in Melbourne and at the 2009 Australian Youth Olympic Festival.

== Professional career ==
Before joining the cliff diving circuit, Iffland worked as an acrobatic trampolining and diving entertainer on cruise ships in the Mediterranean and Caribbean and trained at a theme park in Lyon, France, where she eventually attained dive heights of 20 metres (66 feet).

== Cliff diving ==
In 2015, Iffland was granted a wildcard entry to compete in the opening event of the 2016 Red Bull Cliff Diving World Series.

Competitors dive from heights of 20 metres and reach speeds of 85 km/h.

=== 2016 world series ===
The 2016 Championship was held over a circuit of seven events at various venues. The first event of the 2016 series was held at Possum Kingdom Lake in Texas. After her final dive, a back triple somersault with twist, she was over 10 points ahead and won the round one event. In round two of the championship, held in July at Vila Franca do Campo, Portugal, Iffland again placed first.

In the third round held at Polignano a Mare, Italy in August, she finished second. The fourth round was held in September at Abereiddy's Blue Lagoon in Pembrokeshire, Wales and saw Iffland again awarded first place. Round five, also in September, was held at Mostar where divers leapt from the historic Stari Most bridge; Iffland placed third.

Shirahama in Japan was the location for the sixth round and again Iffland was placed first. By the seventh and final event she had won four rounds and been placed second and third in the other two events. Iffland only needed one dive to be unbeatable by points.

The final event was held at the Dubai Marina in October and, for the first time, saw competitors diving at night under lights. Iffland took her fifth event victory and was named the 2016 champion. As winner of the 2016 championship, Iffland will have automatic entry to the 2017 world series.

=== 2017 world series ===
Rhiannan Iffland – 2017 World Aquatic Championships Budapest

The opening event of the 2017 world series was held on 24 June at Serpent's Lair Inis Mór in Ireland. Iffland won this first round, finishing 50 points ahead of the second place-getter.

=== Later series ===
Iffland won in 2018 and 2019. There was no competition in 2020. She won in 2021-2025.

In 2026, Iffland continues to dominate the competition. She was far enough ahead to ensure a series win before the last event.
