= Madeleine Bayon =

French acrobatic gymnast (born 1997)

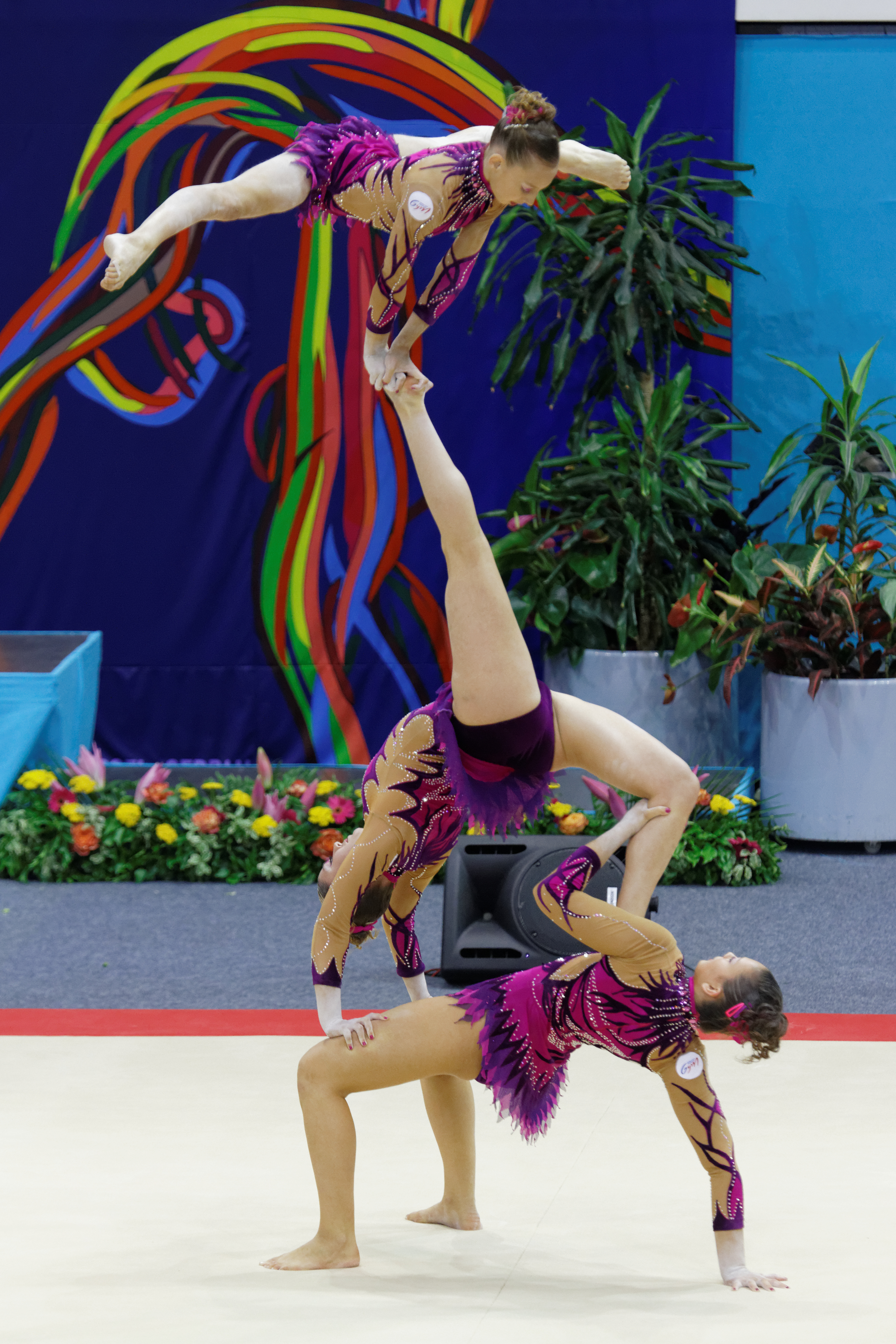
- Madeleine Bayon, Alizée Costes and Noémie Nadaud at the 2014 Acrobatic Gymnastics World Championships

Personal information
- Born: 4 December 1997 (age 28) Lisbonne

Gymnastics career
- Discipline: Acrobatic gymnastics
- Country represented: France
- Club: Cercle Paul Bert Rennes
- Head coaches: Eva Mauriceau, Margot Bardy
- Former coach: Ana Cardoso

Madeleine Bayon (born 4 December 1997) is a French female acrobatic gymnast and high diver. With partners Alizée Costes and Noémie Nadaud, Bayon achieved 7th at the 2014 Acrobatic Gymnastics World Championships.
