= Elisa Cosetti =

Italian high diver (born 2002)

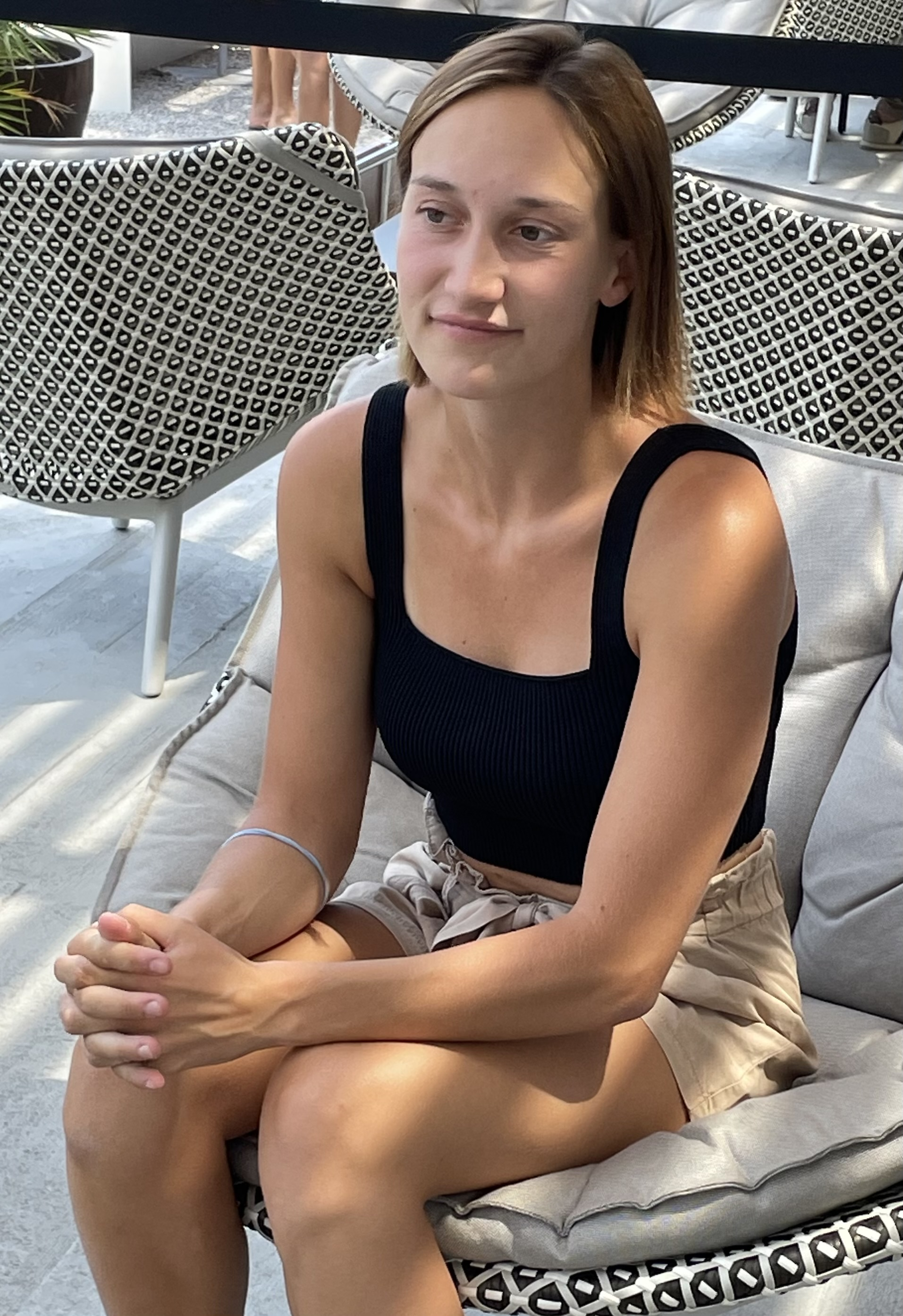
- Cosetti in 2025

Personal information
- Nationality: Italian
- Born: 24 July 2002 (age 24) Trieste, Italy

Sport
- Country: Italy
- Sport: High diving
Medal record
Women's High diving
Representing Italy
European Championships
Silver medal – second place	2026 Paris	Women
Bronze medal – third place	2022 Rome	Women

Elisa Cosetti (born 24 July 2002) is an Italian high diver.

== Career ==
Cosetti competed at the 2022 European Aquatics Championships and won a bronze medal in the high diving event. She then made her World Aquatics Championships debut in 2023 and finished in ninth place in the high diving event.

In August 2026, she competed at the 2026 European Aquatics Championships and won a silver medal in high diving with a score of 297.20 points.

== Personal life ==
Cosetti began dating fellow high diver Andrea Barnabà in late 2023.
