= Iris Schmidbauer =

German high diver (born 1995)

Personal information
- Born: 11 April 1995 (age 31)

Sport
- Country: Germany
- Sport: High diving
Medal record
Representing Germany
European Championships
Gold medal – first place	2022 Rome	Women

Iris Schmidbauer (born 11 April 1995) is a German high diver. She represented Germany at the 2017 World Aquatics Championships in Budapest, Hungary and at the 2019 World Aquatics Championships in Gwangju, South Korea. In 2019, she finished in 8th place and in 2017, she finished in 10th place.

In 2019, she finished in 8th place in the 2019 Red Bull Cliff Diving World Series.
